= Korean mask =

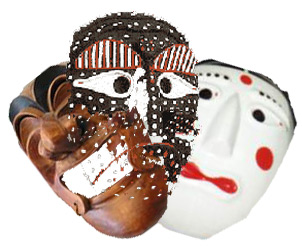

Korean name
- Hangul: 탈
- RR: tal
- MR: t'al

Korean masks, or tal (Korean: 탈), have a long tradition with the use in a variety of contexts. They are also known by many others names such as gamyeon, gwangdae, chorani, talbak, and talbagaji. Korean masks come with black cloth attached to the sides of the mask designed to cover the back of the head and also to simulate black hair. They were most often used in indigenous theatre alongside the storytellers and musicians of that time period. They are still in use today.

Talchum (the Korean mask dance using tal) was identified as a UNESCO Intangible Cultural Heritage in November 2022.

== Purpose ==
They were used in war, on both soldiers and their horses; ceremonially, for burial rites in jade and bronze and for indigenous ceremonies to drive away evil spirits, to remember the faces of great historical figures, and in the arts, particularly in ritual dances, courtly, and theatrical plays. Some present mainstream uses are as miniature masks for gifting or on cell phones where they hang as good-luck talismans.

There are two ways to categorize masks: ceremonial masks and artistic masks. The ceremonial masks were often used to ward off evil spirits and the artistic masks were mostly used in dances and theater shows.

== Dance masks ==
There are about 250 types of tal, and they vary in shape. Masks in the central district usually look pretty and similar to human face. In the southern province, masks are used for theatre and ceremonies.

== Shamanistic masks ==
The more horrifying or grotesque masks were usually used in shamanistic practices for their ability to evoke fear, and humor, in ceremonial rites. The masks were often carved from alder wood after Japanese colonialism, with several coats of lacquer to give the masks gloss, and waterproof them for wearing. Before then, the masks were carved using Korea's sacred wood, such as birch or pine. They were usually also painted and often had hinges for mouth movement. A mask is used to perform ancestral rites or to drive away evil spirits by wearing a mask.

Typically, one sees the following, some of which are designated as national cultural properties. The Hahoe, Sandae, and Talchum are all traditional Korean mask dramas of ceremonial significance.

Hahoe Byeolsin gut is a kind of theatrical exorcist demonstration while performers wear masks, such as some of the original masks made of wood: yangban (nobleman), bune (maiden), seonbi (scholar), gaksi (mother), chorangi (nobleman's servant), halmi (grandmother), juji (head monk), jungi (monk), baekjeong (butcher), and imae (intern/scholar's servant).

== The original 12 Hahoe masks ==
There are twelve traditional characters in Hahoe talchum: Yangban (nobleman), bune (maiden), seonbi (scholar), gaksi (mother), chorangi (nobleman's servant), halmi (grandmother), jungi (monk), baekjeong (butcher), and imae (intern/scholar's servant), chongkak (the bachelor), byulchae (the tax collector), and toktari (the old man).

Three masks are 'lost' due to the Korean war and Japanese colonialism. The byulchae mask has been spotted in a Japanese museum. The chongkak and toktari masks are thought to be in Pyongsan, North Korea, separated during the Korean war.

== Cultural assets and national treasures ==
The mask play of Hahoe Byeolsin Exorcism itself was classified as important intangible cultural asset #69 by the South Korean government on November 17, 1980. Hahoe (하회) and Byeolsin masks themselves were also labelled South Korean national treasure #121 at the same time. The Hahoe mask dance is one of the folk dramas of Pungcheon Hahoe village in Andong city, and dates from the Goryeo Dynasty.

== Gallery ==
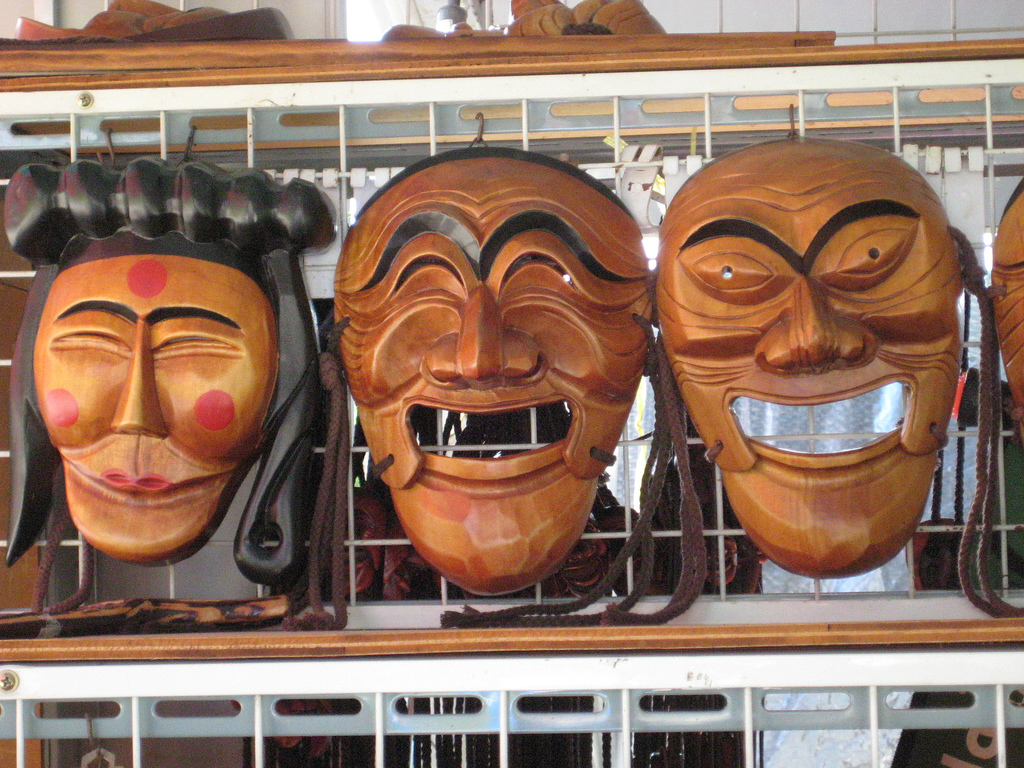
Hahoetal

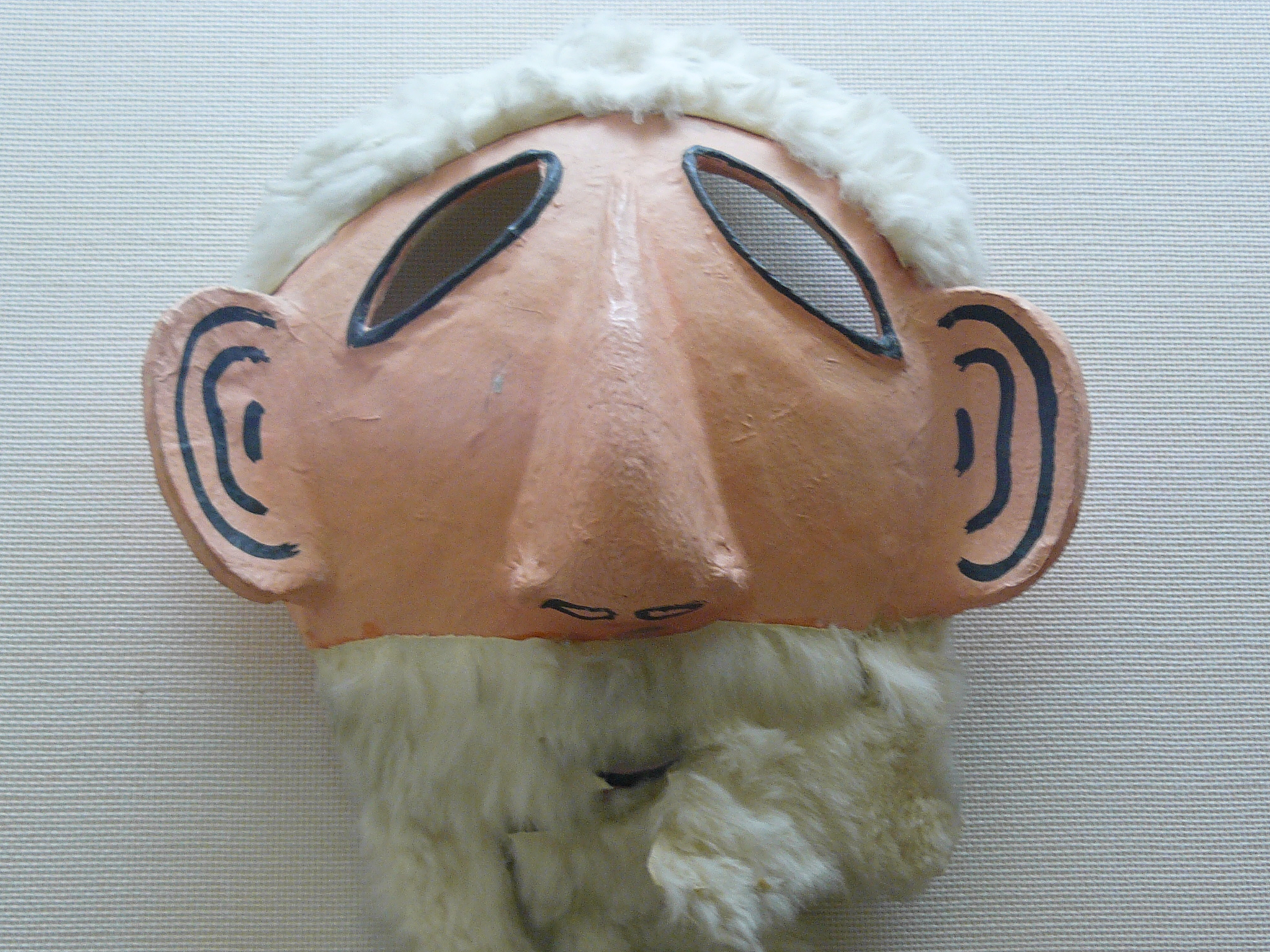
Chayangbantal

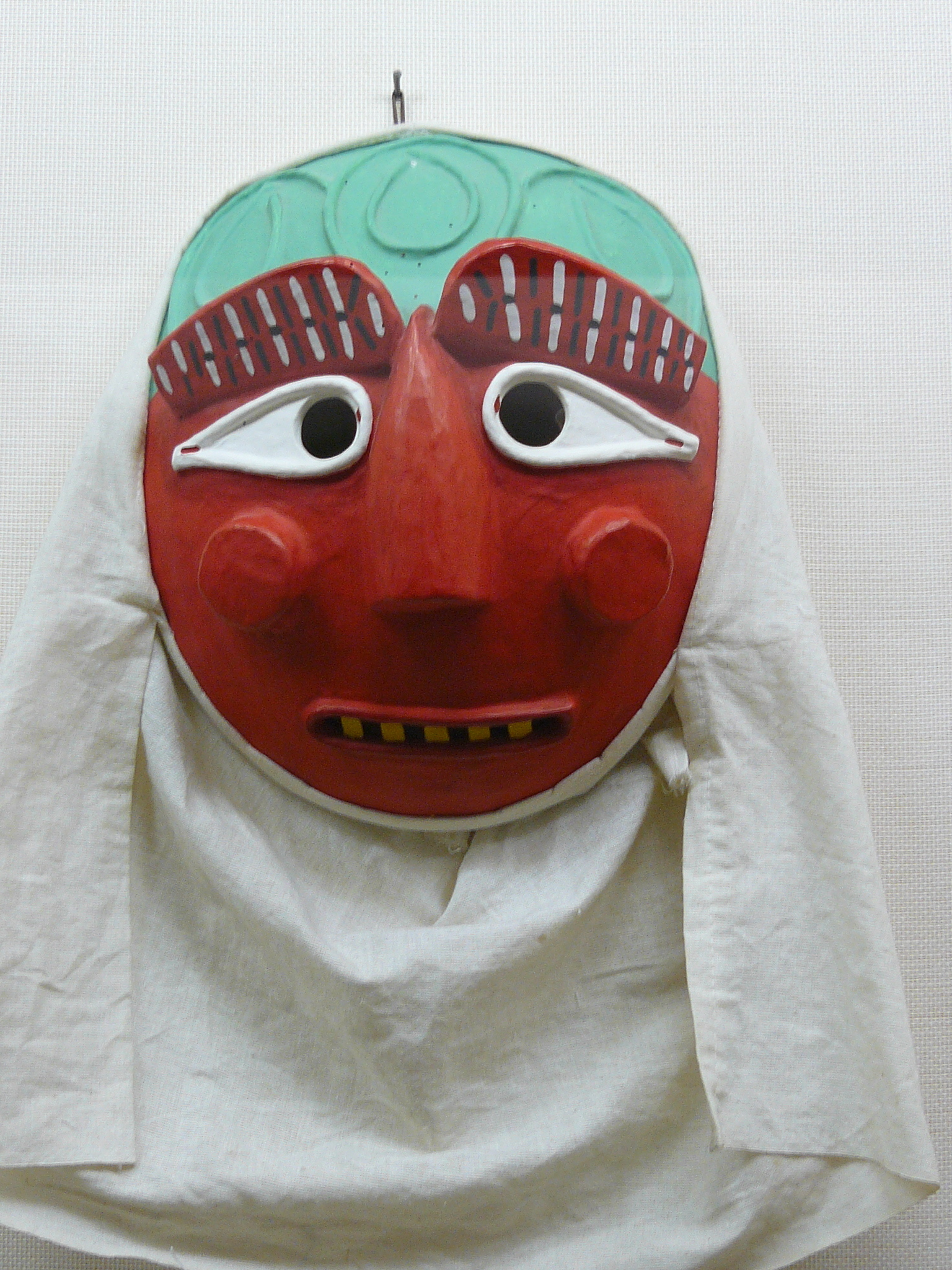
Yeoniptal

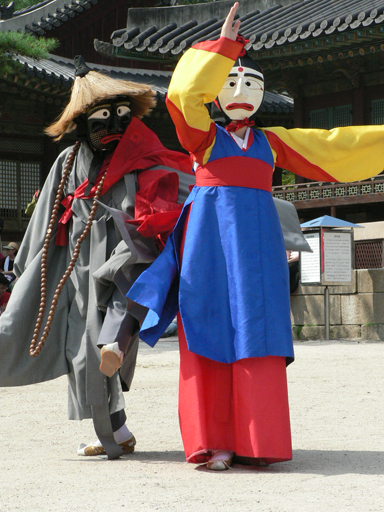
Songpa sandaenori

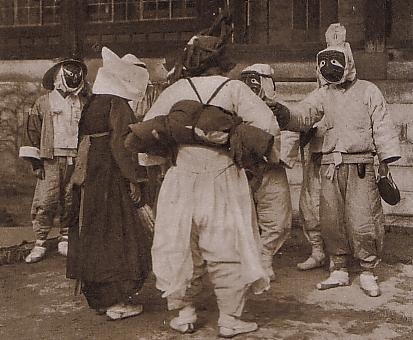
Talchum

== See also ==
- Korean culture
- Korean theatre
- Korean art
- Hahoe village
- Talchum
