= Eunyul talchum =

Korean traditional mask dance

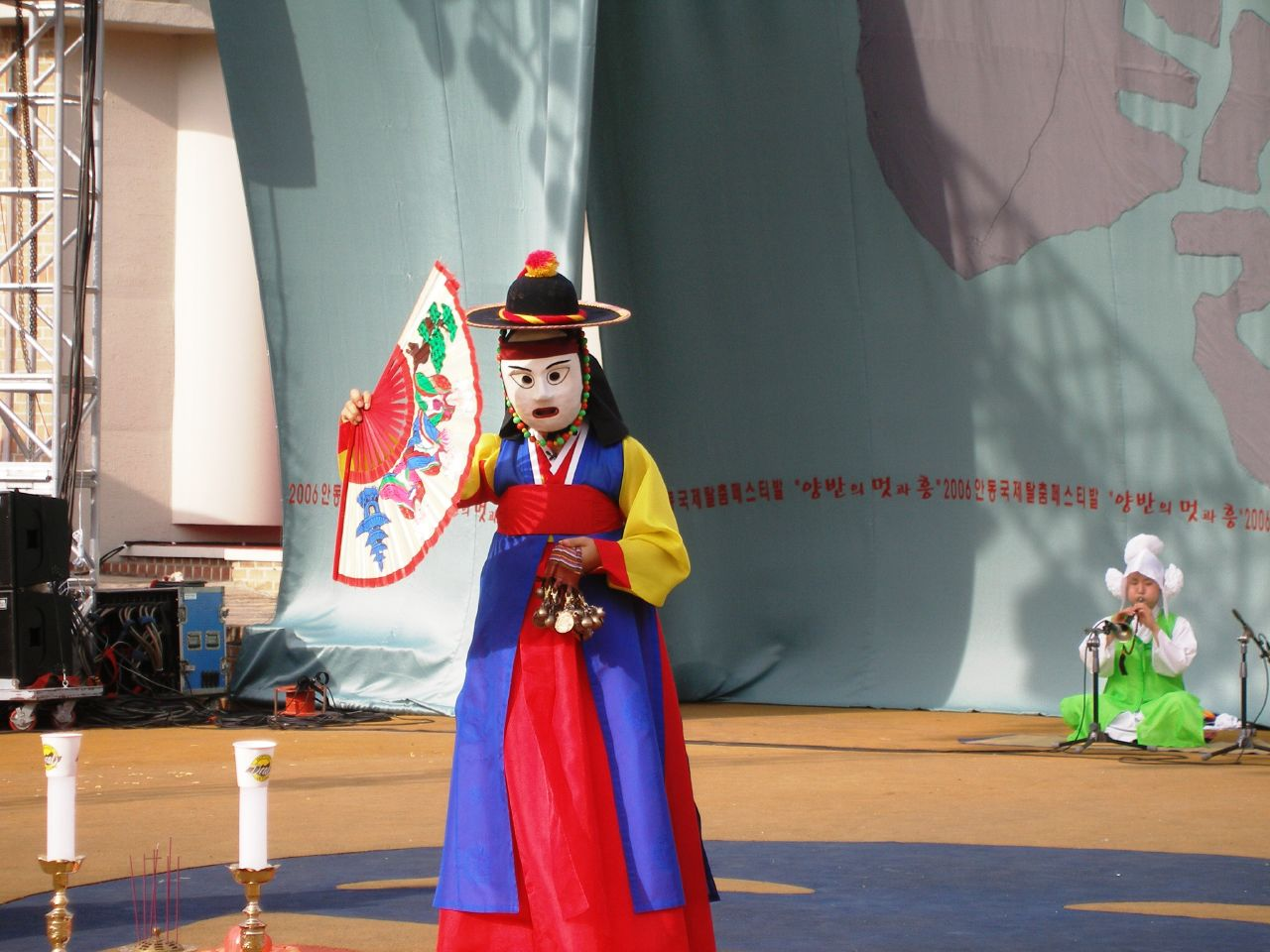

Korean name
- Hangul: 은율탈춤
- Hanja: 殷栗탈춤
- RR: Eunyul talchum
- MR: Ŭnyul t'alch'um

The Eunyul talchum is a type of talchum, Korean traditional mask drama which has been handed down in Eunyul, Hwanghae Province, present North Korea. It is also one of sandaenori, a mask dance that developed in Seoul and the mid-metropolitan region. It is designated as the No. 61 asset of the Important Intangible Cultural Properties by South Korea.

The mask drama consists of six acts – Lion Dance, Sangjwa Dance, Mokjung Dance, Old Monk Dance, and Dance of the Old Couple.

== Gallery ==
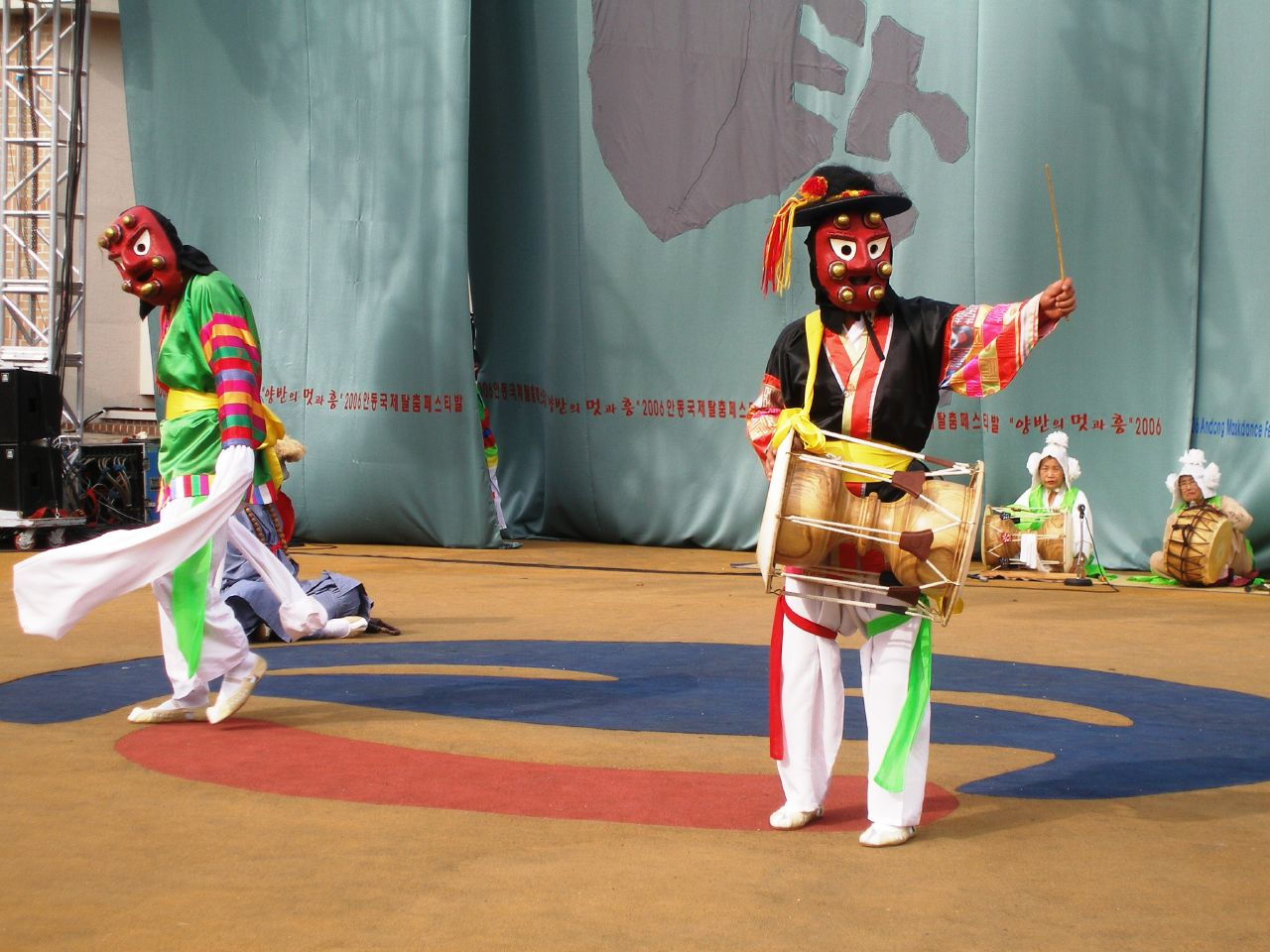

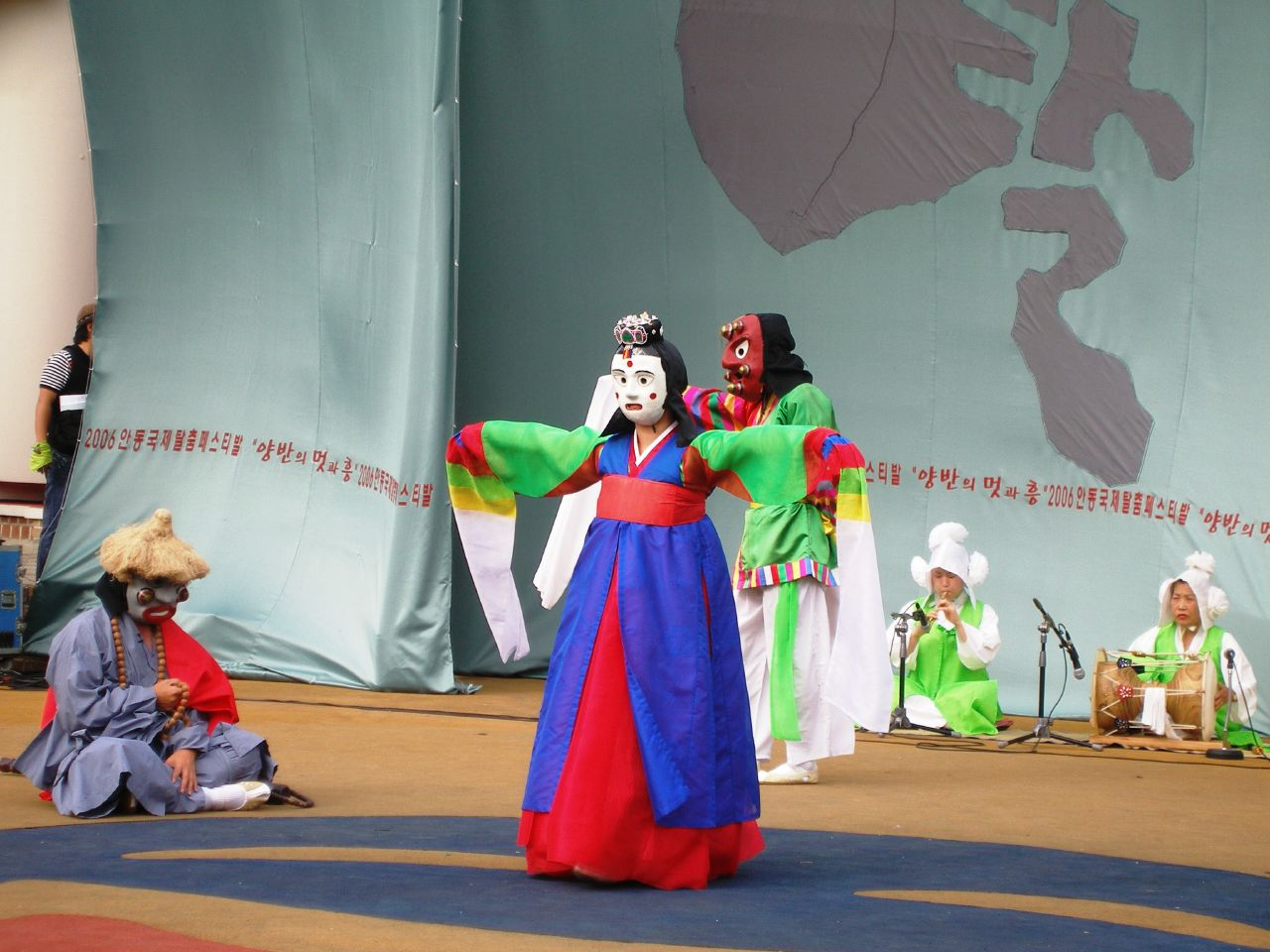

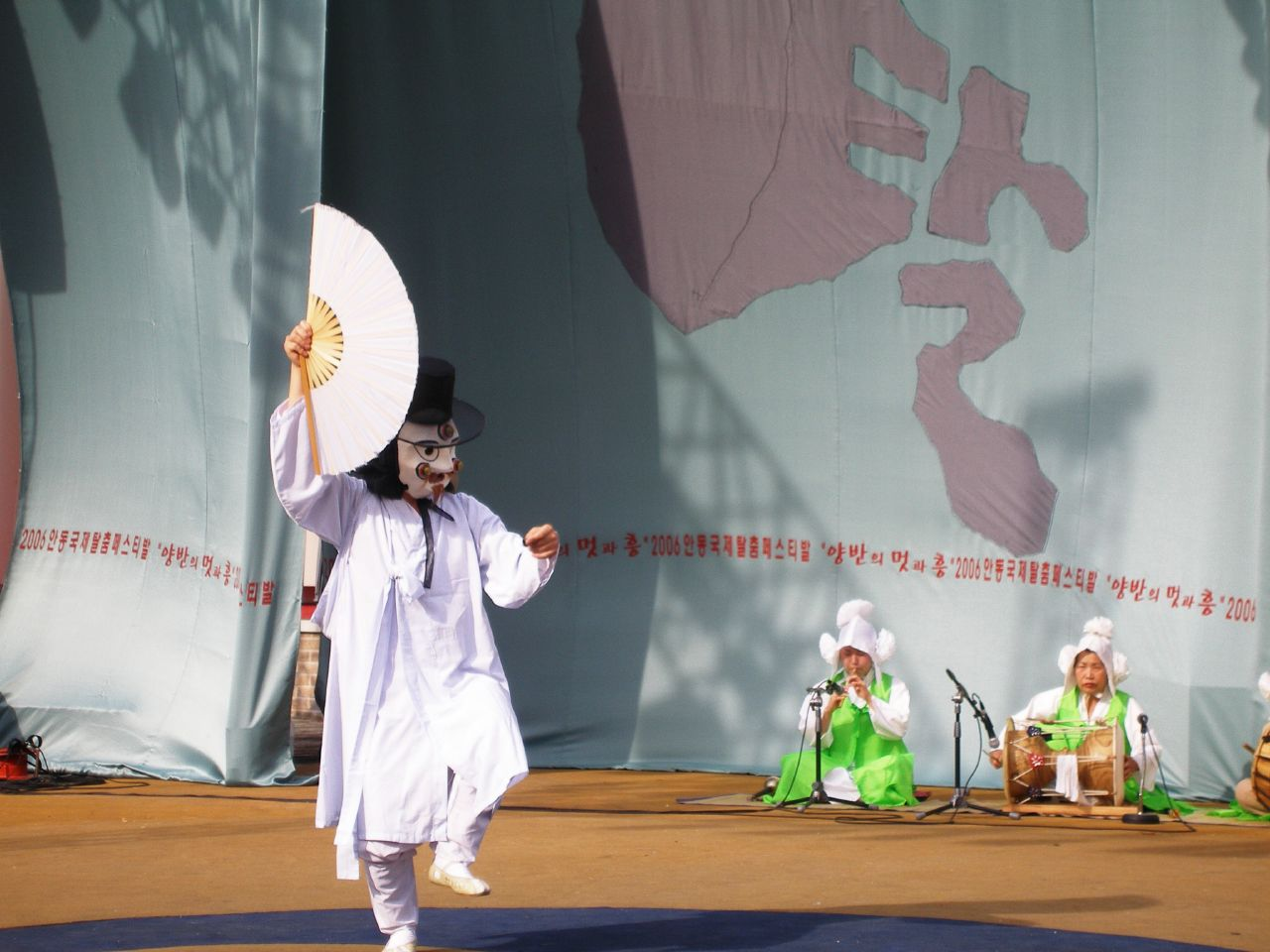

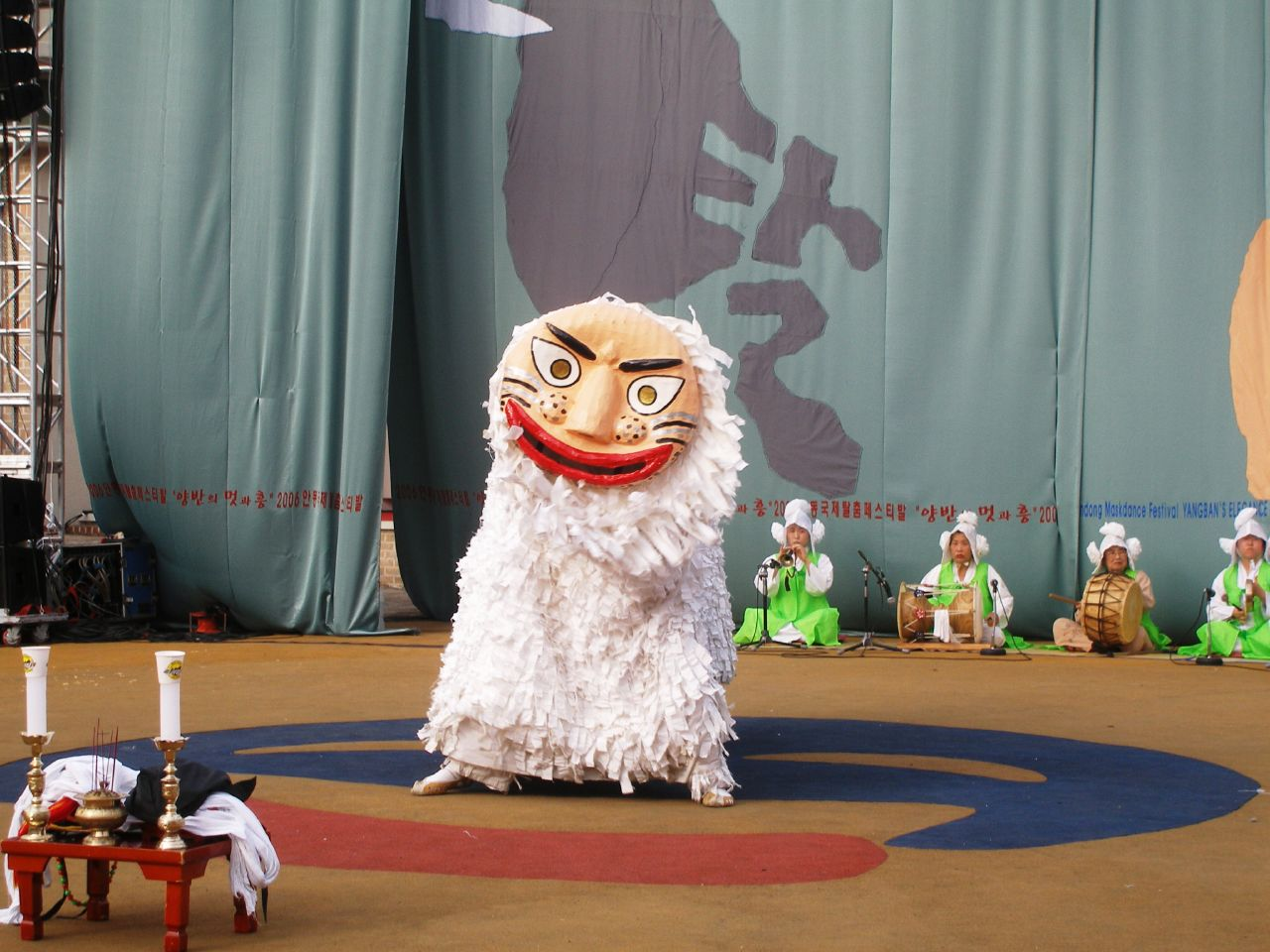

== See also ==
- Talchum
- Songpa Sandae Noli
- Namsadang nori
- Important Intangible Cultural Properties of Korea
