= Chingbirok =

17th-century Korean historical document

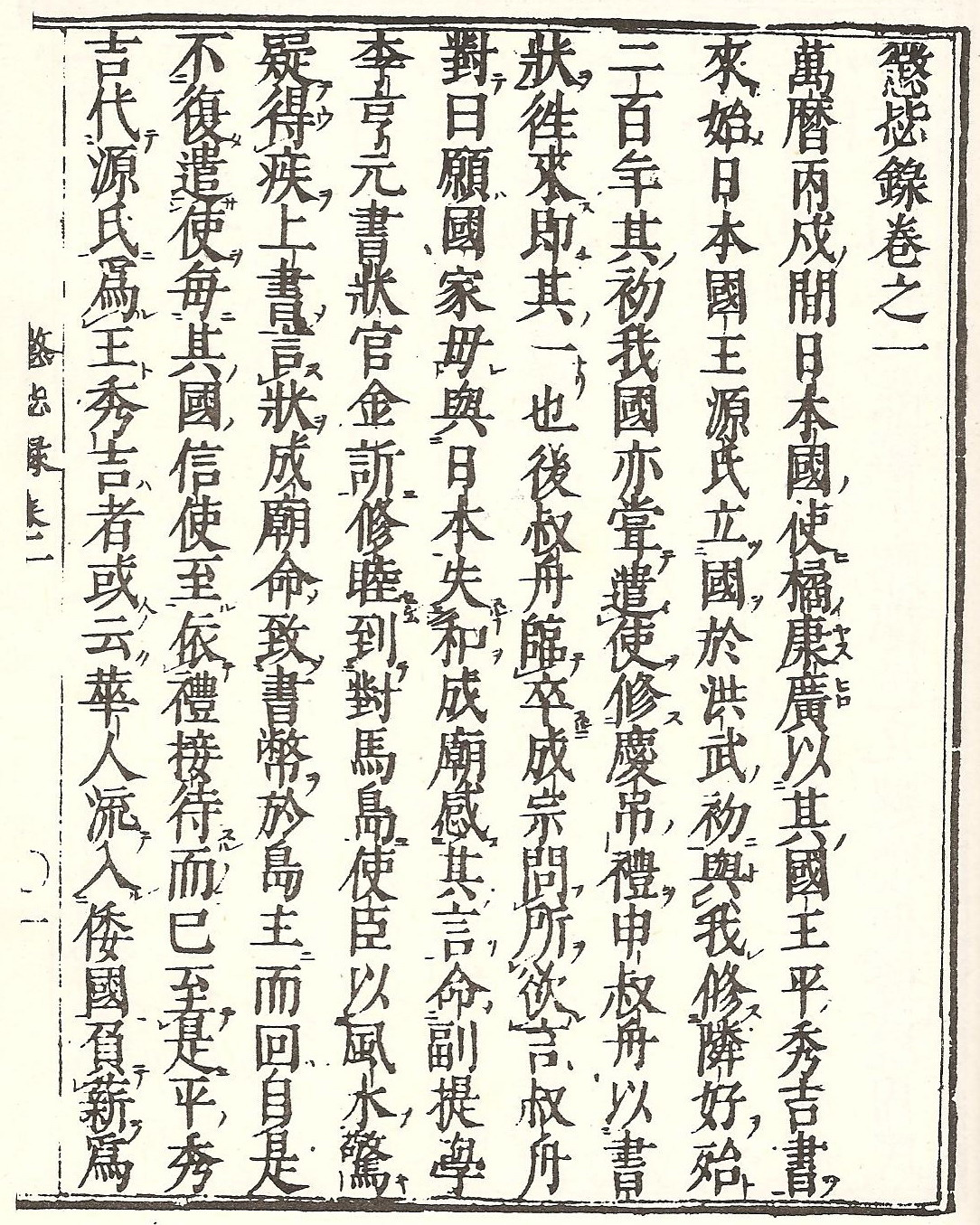
- First page of the Chingbirok, 1695 Japanese edition

Korean name
- Hangul: 징비록
- Hanja: 懲毖錄
- RR: Jingbirok
- MR: Chingbirok

The Chingbirok (Korean: 징비록; Hanja: 懲毖錄; Korean pronunciation: [t͡ɕiŋbiɾok̚]; also called the Book of Corrections) is a first hand account of the Imjin War written by high ranking Joseon scholar-official Yu Sŏngnyong. It is written in hanja.

Party to high level decision making on the allied Ming-Joseon side and able to access all Joseon records, Yu Sŏngnyong's Chingbirok has become an invaluable source in the study of the conflict, and Chinese-Korean-Japanese relations. In 1969 the Chingbirok was listed as the 132nd of the National Treasures of South Korea.

== Creation ==
=== Yu Sŏngnyong ===
Yu Sŏngnyong (1542–1607) was born in Uiseong, in Gyeongsang province, during the Korean Joseon Dynasty, to a yangban family of the Pungsan Yu clan. Passing the Samsai level of the Gwageo civil service examination in 1564, and the Mungwa level in 1566, Yu rose through the ranks of the scholar-official bureaucracy holding various positions including Jwauijeong (Second State Councillor) and Ijo Panseo (Minister of Personnel). At the time of the 1592 Japanese invasion of Korea Yu held the position of a provincial Dochechalsa. During the war Yu was appointed Yeonguijeong (First State Councillor), and it was in this capacity that he helped direct the Joseon defences, being responsible for all Joseon military units and leaders, including Yi Sun-sin and Gwon Yul.

After the war in 1598, Yu was ousted from office by factional infighting, although he was later rehabilitated he refused to serve again in high office. The Chingbirok was written and compiled at this time by Yu in his home village, now preserved in the Hahoe Folk Village, in today's Andong, North Gyeongsang Province.

=== Purpose ===
Yu Sŏngnyong wrote the Chingbirok in order to prevent such an invasion from happening again, reflecting on the mistakes. In the preface he writes that during the conflict the Joseon state suffered "the loss of three capitals, and collapse everywhere" (三都失守，八方瓦解) reflecting on his own role in this he wrote that he was "not up to the task the nation entrusted, the ills that nation suffered was because of threats not grasped, this cannot be swept away, nor can death atone for this guilt" (無似受國重任，於流離板蕩之際，危不持，顛不扶，罪死無赦). Yu placed the blame for the disaster suffered by Joseon on his own inadequate emphasis on national security, and was therefore resolved to properly document hard lessons dearly paid for, with the hope that following generations could avoid the mistakes that he had made. Although the Chingbirok includes details of Japanese atrocities, the focus of the Chingbirok is on Joseon failures, and Yu is harsher in his assessment of his own side than he is of the enemy.

== Publication history ==
=== Structure ===
The early form of the Chingbirok was completed by the time of the 37th year of King Seonjo's reign (1604) and consisted of sixteen scrolls and a coda:

- Scrolls One and Two, are written in the form of an annal, being a chronology from 1586 to 1598 of events between the Joseon-Ming allies and the Japanese
- Scrolls Three to Five, Roots (芹曝集), background leading up to the invasion
- Scrolls Six to Fourteen, Jin-Sa Records (辰巳錄), documents, orders and proclamations made by the author as prime minister (Note: Jin-Sa Records (辰巳錄) is named after the Earthly Branches used to denote years in the Sexagenary cycle, 1592 was Im-Jin (壬辰), 1593 Gye-Sa (癸巳))
- Scrolls Fifteen to Sixteen, Military transcripts (軍門謄錄), transcripts and the author's correspondence between 1595 and 1598 regarding the conflict
- Coda, A Record of the Crisis (亂後雜記), a record of events during the conflict

By 1633 (11th year of King Injo's reign) this had evolved into a widely read two volume format known as the Seoaejip consisting of the Jingibrok and Ryu Seong-ryong's The Anthology of Seoae (Korean: 서애집; Hanja: 西厓集)). In 1647 the Jingibrok was issued as a single stand alone volume.

=== Printed editions ===
Classical Chinese

- 1647, published by Gyeongsang-do governor Jo Su-ik
- 1695, Japanese Kanban edition published in Kyoto in two volumes (Note: The infobox image is from this edition)
- 1913, as part of a multi volume collection of Joseon works, Classic Joseon Books Publication Society. (Note: Online version of the 1913 Chinese edition, Japanese National Diet Library)

Modern Korean (Hangul)

Japanese (translations)

- 1876, Translation of Joseon Yu's Chōhiroku, in one volume, translated by Osanai Ryotaro and Minoru Suzuki (Note: Online version of the 1876 Japanese edition, Japanese National Diet Library)
- 1894, Joseon Chōhiroku, (Note: Online version of the 1894 Japanese edition, Japanese National Diet Library)
- 1921, Chōhiroku, translated by Nagano Naohiko (Note: Online version of the 1921 Japanese edition, Japanese National Diet Library)
- 1966, Chōhiroku, translated by Soga Masataka, (Note: NCID：BN05109352 at Japanese CiNii bibliographic database)
- 1979, Chōhiroku, translated by Pak Chong Myung, The Eastern Library, ISBN 4582803571

English

- The Book of Corrections: Reflections on the National Crisis During the Japanese Invasion of Korea, 1592-1598, an English translation of the Chingbirok, Yu Sŏngnyong, translated by Choi Byong-hyon, ISBN 1557290768

== See also ==
- The Jingbirok: A Memoir of Imjin War
- The Second World War (book series)
