= Sandae-nori =

Korean mask dance performance genre

Sandae-nori (Korean: 산대놀이) is a regional variant of Korean mask dance drama. According to some scholars, it may be the root form of many other Korean mask dance dramas today, as it was created and managed by the Sandae Dogam, a government office in charge of providing entertainment both in the capital and in important regional centers. The Sandae Dogam was disbanded in the early 1600s, leaving many performers unemployed and searching for work. It is thought that the stories of these performers became modern day plays such as Songpasandae-nori and Yangju Byeolsandae and influenced many other performance forms in Korea. Although modern Koreans tend to use the Korean term talchum to refer to all types of mask dance drama, talchum is properly only applied to three extant mask dance dramas from Hwanghae Province in North Korea.

== Bibliography ==
- Cho, Oh-kon (1988). Traditional Korean Theatre. New York: Asian Humanities Press. ISBN 978-0-89581-876-8.
- Jeon, Kyungwook (2005). Korean Mask Dance Dramas. Seoul: Youlhwadang. ISBN 89-301-0179-8.
- 이두현 (1981). 한국의탈춤. Seoul: 일지사. ISBN 978-89-7096-196-5.
