= The Jingbirok: A Memoir of Imjin War =

2015 South Korean television series

- Genre: Historical; War
- Based on: Jingbirok
- Written by: Jung Hyung-soo; Jung Ji-yeon
- Directed by: Kim Sang-hwi; Kim Young-jo
- Starring: Kim Sang-joong; Kim Tae-woo
- Country of origin: South Korea
- Original language: Korean
- No. of episodes: 50

Production
- Running time: 45-55 minutes
- Production company: KBS Media

Original release
- Network: KBS1
- Release: February 14 – August 2, 2015

The Jingbirok: A Memoir of Imjin War (Korean: 징비록; lit. 'The Book of Corrections') is a South Korean historical drama television series. Labeled as "Special Project Epic Drama for 70th Anniversary of Korean Independence Day", it aired on KBS1 every Saturday and Sunday at 21:40 (KST) from February 14 to August 2, 2015.

== Synopsis ==
Based on the memoir "Jingbirok", written in 1604 by Joseon scholar Ryu Seong-ryong (1542–1607), who served as prime minister of the Joseon Kingdom (1392–1910) during the seven-year Imjin War (1592–1598). "Jingbirok" (Book of Corrections) is the name of Ryu's memoir, which looks back on the Japanese invasion under the leadership of Toyotomi Hideyoshi. The memoir covers Ryu Seong-ryong's experiences from 1592 to 1598 during the Japanese invasion of Joseon era Korea. The story takes place in Korea and Japan between the Japanese invasion and the Battle of Noryang where admiral Yi Sun Sin was killed.

== Cast ==
- Kim Sang-joong - Ryu Seong-ryong
- Kim Tae-woo - King Seonjo, the fourteenth king of the Joseon Dynasty
- Noh Young-hak - Prince Gwanghae, the future fifteenth king of the Joseon Dynasty
- Kim Seok-hoon - Yi Sun-sin
- Kim Kyu-cheol - Toyotomi Hideyoshi
- Lee Kwang-ki - Konishi Yukinaga
- Lee Jung-yong - Kato Kiyomasa
- Jo Jae-wan - So Yoshitoshi
- Jang Tae-sung - Emperor Wanli of Ming, the 14th Emperor of the Ming Dynasty (Note: His real name was Zhu Yijun (朱翊鈞), he was the 14th Emperor of the Ming Dynasty and was the third son of the Longqing Emperor (the 13th Emperor of the Ming Dynasty and his predecessor).)
- Hwang In-young - Queen Uiin, King Seonjo's first wife and first queen consort
- Oh Ji-young - Nene, (Note: Also known as One (おね), Nei (ねい) or Toyotomi Yoshiko (豊臣 吉子). Her real name is Kōdai-in (高台院).) Toyotomi Hideyoshi's main wife
- Son Seung-Woo - Yodo, (Note: Also known as Yodo-dono (淀殿) or Yodogimi (淀君). Her real name is Chacha (茶々).) Toyotomi Hideyoshi's concubine and second wife
- Seo Yoon-ah - Noble Consort Zheng/Jung Gwi-Bi (Note: Zheng and Jung/Jeong are considered the same surname (with Zheng being considered the Chinese version, while Jung (or Jeong) is considered the Korean version).) (Korean name), Emperor Wanli's beloved concubine
- Bae Do-hwan - Chen Lin, a Chinese Ming dynasty general and navy admiral

== Awards and nominations ==
Year	Award	Category	Recipient	Result
2015	KBS Drama Awards	Top Excellence Award, Actor	Kim Sang-joong	Nominated
2015	KBS Drama Awards	Excellence Award, Actor in a Serial Drama	Kim Sang-joong	Nominated
2015	KBS Drama Awards	Excellence Award, Actor in a Serial Drama	Kim Tae-woo	Won
2015	KBS Drama Awards	Best Supporting Actor	Kim Kyu-chul	Won
2015	KBS Drama Awards	Best Supporting Actress	Kim Hye-eun	Nominated
