= Talchum =

Korean traditional mask dance

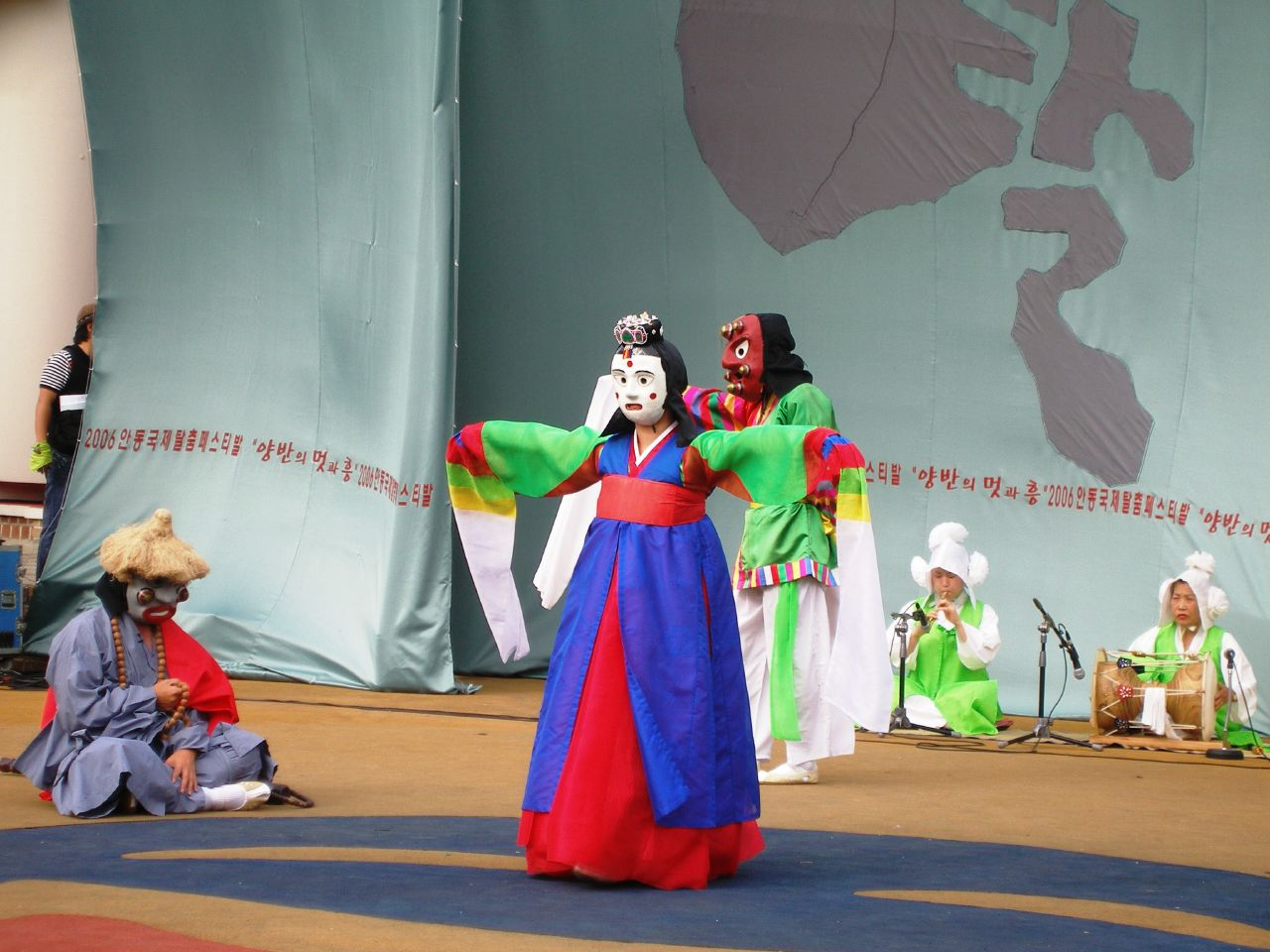
- A mask dance in South Korea

Korean name
- Hangul: 탈춤
- RR: talchum
- MR: t'alch'um

Talchum (Korean: 탈춤; IPA: [ˈtʰa̠(ː)ʎt͡ɕʰum]; lit. 'mask dance') is a Korean dance performed while wearing a mask, and often involves singing and dancing.

Although the term talchum is usually taken to mean all mask dance dramas by most Koreans, it is strictly speaking a regional term originally only applied to dances of Hwanghae Province in present-day North Korea. Dances from the Seoul or Gyeonggi province region are known as sandae noli, whereas dances from the southern coast are known as yayu (야유), which means "field play", or Obangsinjang, which means "dance of five gods". However, talchum is nowadays accepted as a general term for mask dance drama.

The dances also feature drama and story, as masked characters portray people, animals, and even supernatural beings. These folk dramas often reflected the frustrations felt by the lower classes towards the elite yangban.

In 2022, Talchum was inscribed on UNESCO’s Representative List of the Intangible Cultural Heritage of Humanity, highlighting both its local importance and global significance.

== Origin ==
=== Agricultural consciousness ===
It is a theory that the origin of the masquerade is the agricultural consciousness held by farmers for good farming since ancient times. The appearance of agricultural consciousness is well illustrated in burak-gut such as Seonang-gut that remains today. According to the theory of agricultural consciousness, masks made by imitating the face of God were gradually changed into masks that resemble humans, and Gut to magically solve conflicts with nature was transformed into an artistic expression of social conflicts, resulting in a masquerade. The conversion of the Nongak band into a musician or the fact that the audience of the masquerade intervenes in the progress of the play are considered traditions that come down from the stage of Seonang-gut. The variegated (雜色) play of the Nongak band shows the blindness of the masquerade, and the Hahoebyulsingut mask game and the Gangneung Gwanno mask game (陵 government 奴) mask game were mask plays that did not completely escape the form of a gut, and since the agricultural consciousness was an event of farmers, the masquerade grew into a people's play from the beginning.

=== Instrumental theory ===
It is a theory that instrumental music (伎), which was learned by Baekje man Mimaji (味摩) in the Southern Dynasties of China and passed it on to Japan, is the origin of masquerade. Although instrumental music (伎) in the 13th century Japanese literature "Gyohuncho (訓抄 of Church)" is a mukgeuk (默劇), it is argued that instrumental music was handed down as a masquerade because its contents are similar to today's Yangju Byeolsandaenori and Bongsan Mask Dance.

== History ==
Talchum originated in Korean villages as part of shamanic rituals. It then became a form of popular entertainment. It was even performed in the royal court—during the Goryeo period, the Office of Masked-Dance Drama (Sandae Togam) supervised such dances. The office however was abolished during the Joseon period.

=== Masque of the Three Kingdoms period ===
The origin of the mask dance dates back to the end of the 9th century, and you can get a glimpse of the traces of the use of masks in the fifth period of Choi Chi-won's "Hyangak Japyeong", namely, Woljeon, Daemyeon, Geumhwan, Sokdok, and Sanye. What is regrettable is that the poem is too simple and the content is not detailed. However, as a mask play, this is the first record in Korea. In addition to this, it is said that in the Silla Dynasty, there were sword dances and Cheoyong dances as mask play, but there are no accurate literature and relics about this. However, it is said that this mask dance is a story of face-to-face 戱 and young Gwanchang through dance, as the suggestion of the sword dance as a mask dance can be obtained from the article of "Catch Up Donggyeong" and "Pungseongjo". In the same book, it was said that Cheoyongmu also dances with a mask. However, looking at the article "Bibigo Literature" and "Hwangchangrangmu (黃昌郞舞)", it is questionable whether a mask was used even at the time of Silla when these two plays occurred. However, it can be presumed that it is clear that masks were used later from the above-described literature. This sword dance has been handed down to this day and it is seen that Augusti and the sword dance we see today do not wear masks, which is thought to have been after posterity passed down from male play to female play. In any case, it is thought that this sword dance was intended to express and inspire the spirit of Hwarangdo (郞 way) when Silla was trying to achieve the feat of unification as a sword dance. Cheoyongmu has been seen dancing in a mask through Goryeo and Joseon to this day, and it seems that it was the oldest in the literature that it was performed (演戱) in the 23rd year of King Gojong (1236) through the 23rd year of King Gojong of the Goryeo Dynasty and Shin Woo-jo (辛禑條). Even after coming to the Joseon Dynasty, this mask Cheoyongmu has been performed centering on the court, so the performance is covered (散見) in "Yongjae Chonghwa". In any case, Cheoyongmu must be seen as one of the magical and 呪術 dances of ancient society based on the legend of Cheoyong that occurred at the end of the Silla Dynasty.

=== Sandae japhee of the Goryeo Dynasty ===
During the Goryeo Dynasty, there were mask-wearing narye events and sandae japhee. Narye is a ritual held on the night of the Lunar New Year's Eve to welcome a pleasant and joyful New Year by expelling evil spirits, the source of disasters and sickness throughout the year. According to the Literature Memorandum, this event was held until King Injo of the Joseon Dynasty when he entered the Korean Peninsula in the 6th year of King Jeongjong of Goryeo. Meanwhile, unlike Narye, there was a sandae japhee at the end of Goryeo. This japhee also included masks such as Cheoyongmu, but it became more popular when it entered the Joseon Dynasty.

== Themes and characteristics ==
Mask dance dramas share fundamental characteristics but vary considerably according to region and performer. Basic themes include exorcism rites, ritual dances, satire, parody of human weaknesses, social evils, and the elites. They appeal to the audiences by ridiculing apostate Buddhist monks, decadent upper-class men, and shamans. Another popular theme is the conflict between an old wife and a seductive concubine. With regional variations, the mask dance drama was generally performed on the First Full Moon, Buddha's Birthday (석가탄신일) on the Eighth of the Fourth Moon, the Dano Festival, and Chuseok. Variations may have been performed at festive state occasions or at rituals to bring about rain. Audience participation is also a feature of the dance.

== Procedure ==
Mask dance is largely divided into seven parts.

The first chief's (상좌, Sang-Jwa) dance is a ritualistic dance about the Sasindo, meaning 'to drive out demons'.

The second section consists of eight monk dances, which are the first and second beopgonori. The evil monk dance shows itself decayed, introducing itself to the editorial and dance, respectively. The beopgonori tells a joke about a man and a woman taking off their clothes with a law school in their neck. Recently, beopgonori has disappeared.

The third section is a Sadang dance (사당춤) performed by seven masters (거사, Geo-sa), and appears in a shrine decorated with splendor. When a widower is kicked out of the shrine for mocking, seven of them sing a playful song.

The fourth section is a veteran dance (노장춤, No-Jang). The dance shows the satire of a Buddhist monk who was praised as a living Buddha by Somu (소무, So-moo), a pub girl, or a concubine.

The fifth section is a lion sent by the Buddha to punish them for losing a lion dance. They try to eat their food and then they listen to the repentance and forgive and dance together.

The sixth chapter consists mainly of talking with the three yangban (well educated people) brothers, the stake and the yangban, with the yangban dance. Through the game of selecting a new residence, Sijojigi ('make a poem', 시조짓기), Paja Nori (make a poem with divided or combine Hanja, 파자놀이), and catching chuibbali ('a person who embezzled public funds', 취발이). Through the play, the Malttoki ('a crown', 말뚝이) use poetry and satire are used to scold the yangban.

The seventh section meets Young-gam (영감, 'old man or a low-ranking official') and Mi-Yal-Hal-mi (미얄할미), who had been separated during a tumultuous dance, and they were quarreled because of the concubine's house, which he brought to them, and Mi-Yal was beaten to death by the Young-gam. An old man named Namgang appears and calls a shaman to perform a Jin-Ogwi rite (진오귀굿). Showing the perils of working-class life and the tyranny of men over women due to polygamy, the last performance shows that the origin of mask dance is in the gut (굿, a ritual performance in Korea).

== Place of performance ==
A suitable place for performance is where a large audience can gather. The audience looks around the stage almost in a circle, but there is nothing on the stage, and only one side of the stage is a house called the Gaebok-cheong where performers change their masks and clothes. Although the stage is a flat floor that is as high as the stands, Bongsan Talchum also makes the stands higher. The reason is for merchants to sell food instead of admission to audience in the attic.

== Styles ==
Mask dance dramas have been transmitted from all parts of the country. There are about thirteen different types of mask dance drama in Korea ― Hwanghaedo province's Haeseo style, such as Bongsan Talchum, Gangnyeong Talchum, Eunyul Talchum; Gyeonggi Province province's Yangju Byeolsandae, Songpa Sandae Noli Mask Dances; South Gyeongsang Province province's Suyeong Yayu, Dongnae Yayu, Gasan Ogwangdae, Tongyeong Ogwandae, Goseong Ogwangdae; Gyeongsangbukdo province's Hahoe byeolsingut talnori; Gangwon province's Gangneung Gwanno Gamyeon'guk mask dance; and the Namsadang (male itinerant entertaining troupe of the Northern Line) Deotboegichum mask dance. Among those, Bongsan Talchum and Hahoe byeolsingut talnori are best known today.

== Imaginary creatures in Talchum ==
Yeongno (영노)

A monster that eats bad yangbans. In some plays, if this creature eats 100 yangbans, then it can go up to heaven. Yeongno is described to have a red long face (similar to a dragon) and also wears a yellow robe that looks like scales (the colors can change according to the region). Some believe they could be imoogi according to similarities in some legends about imoogi and yeongno's role in the show:

Another legend says that if the imoogi catches an evil person it can ascend to heaven as a dragon, this story in particular is what makes people think the two might be related.

Bibi (비비)

A kind of yeongno, they make a menacing bi-bi sound by playing a willow pipe. They have a monster's head on top of a human body.

Jangjamari (장자마리)

Water spirits. They are very fat, play instruments, and have seaweed all over their bodies. They may also be associated with fertility.

In Gangneung Gwanno Gamyeon'geuk, they are associated with fertility and the summer transplanting season, dancing, wearing clothes that bear the color of tilled earth, and decorated in rice seedlings as well as seaweed.

Juji (주지)

Juji are strange beings. They look like birds with very small heads or can have heads like those of lions. Two couples jump all around. The dances between the couples may symbolize fertility. However, the dance between the two lions could also indicate scaring away evil spirits.

== Gallery ==
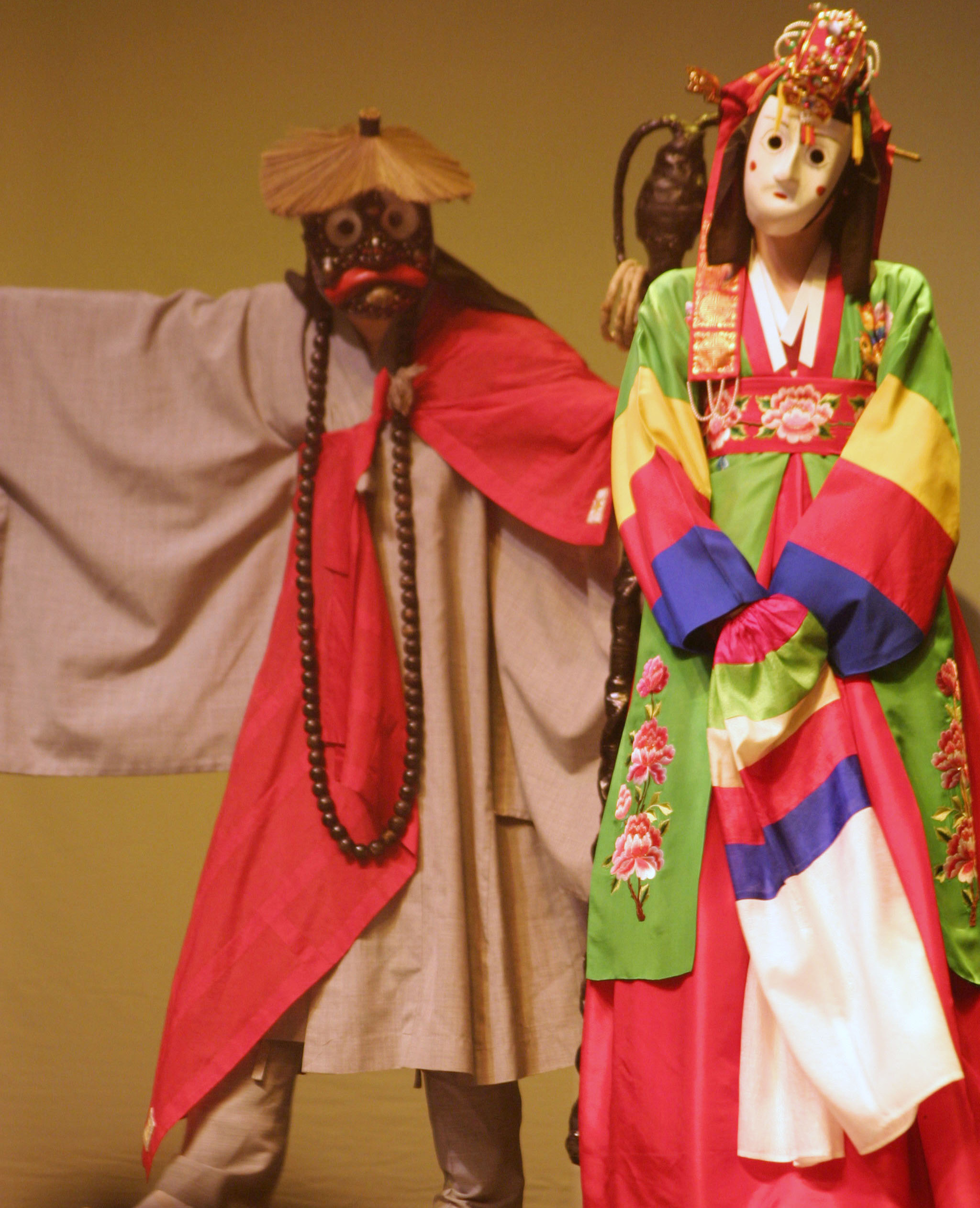
Bongsan Talchum

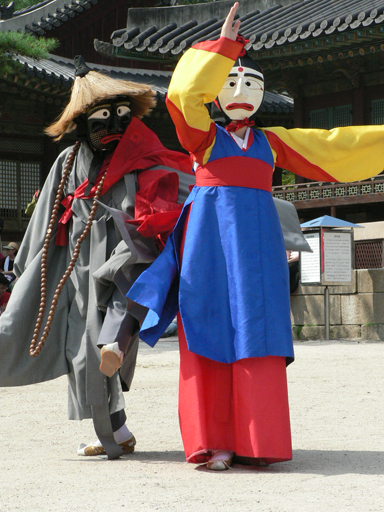
Songpa Sandae Noli

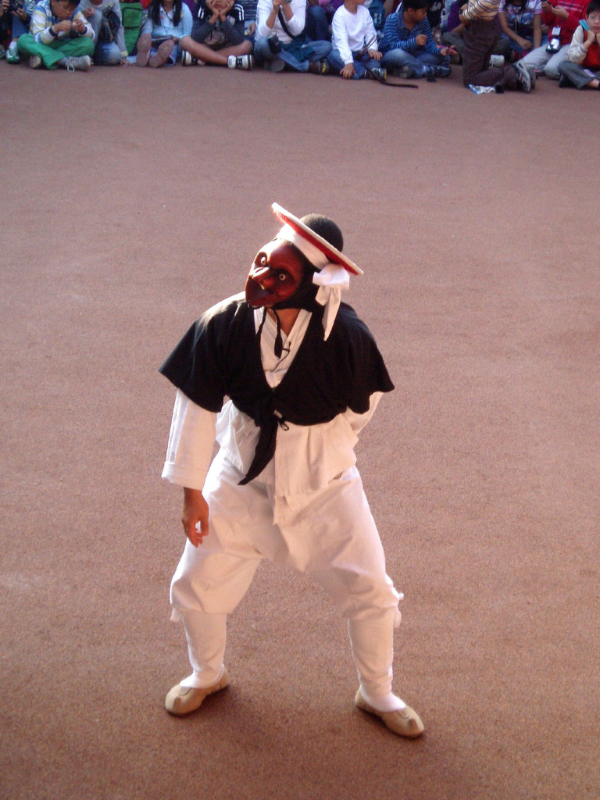
Hahoi Byeolshin'gut Talnoli

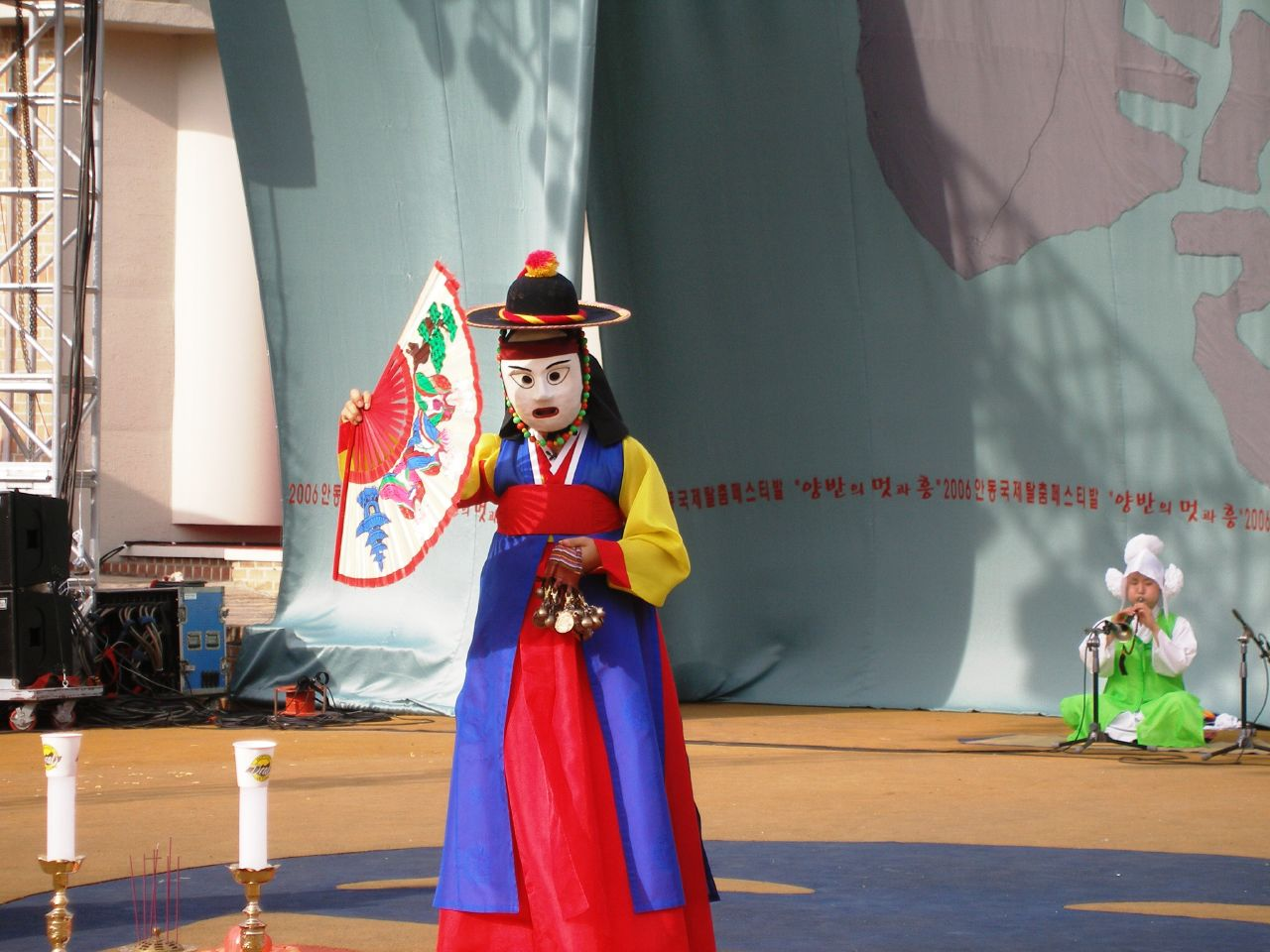
Eunyul Talchum

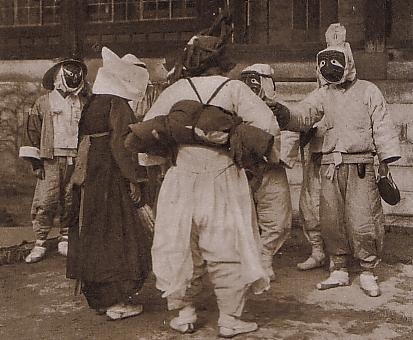
Korean mask play

== General references ==
- Chae, Heewan. “The idea of Talchum.” Seoul: Hyunamsa, 1984
- "What is mask." Hahoe Mask Museum retrieved 29 June 2008
- Kim, Joo-yeon. "Talchum: Korean masked dance." The KNU times, 1 November 2006
- Kim, Ukdong. "The aesthetics of Talchum." Seoul: Hyunamsa, 1999
- "Korean Mask Dance Drama: Talchum." The magazine of Santa Clarita retrieved 29 June 2008
- "Mask Dances." Asian Studies presents Windows on Asia, retrieved 29 June 2008
- "Mask and Dance." Korean cultural Services NY, retrieved 25 June 2008
- "Talchum." Digital Choseonilbo retrieved 29 June 2008
- "Talchum.", retrieved 29 June 2008
- "The Nature and Origin of Masked Dance Drama." Hangukgwan, retrieved 29 June 2008
