= Choi Byonghyon =

South Korean writer (born 1950)

- Hangul: 최병현
- RR: Choe Byeonghyeon
- MR: Ch'oe Pyŏnghyŏn

Choi Byonghyon (Korean: 최병현; born 1950) is a South Korean academic and translator.

== Career ==
Choi is a poet, writer of fiction, and scholar of English literature. He has also translated historically important classic Korean texts into English.

== Translations ==
- Sŏng-nyong Yu, The Book of Corrections: Reflections on the National Crisis During the Japanese Invasion of Korea, 1592-1598. Institute of East Asian Studies, University of California, 2002 (a translation of Jingbirok)
- Yagyong Chong, Admonitions on Governing the People: Manual for All Administrators. University of California, 2010 (a translation of Mingmin Simsŏ)
- The Annals of King T'aejo: Founder of Korea's Choson Dynasty. Harvard University Press, 2014.
