= Hahoe byeolsingut talnori =

Korean masked dance-drama

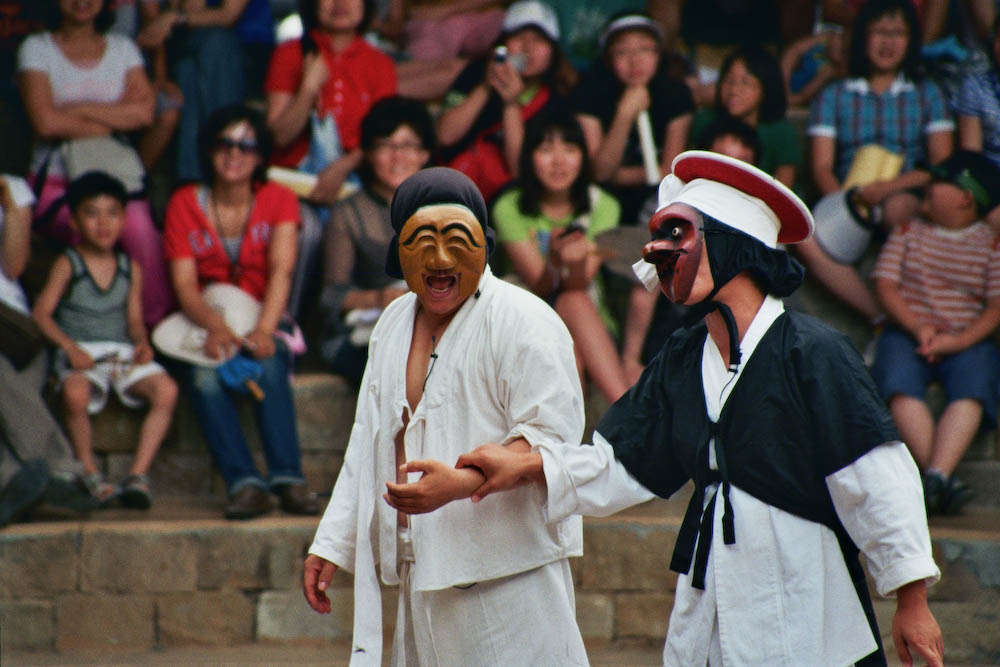
Masked dancers at Hahoe

Hahoe byeolsingut talnori (Korean: 하회별신굿탈놀이; Hanja: 河回別神굿탈놀이) or "Hahoe special ritual drama to the gods" is a Korean masked dance-drama performed every three, five, or ten years at the request of the village deity in Hahoe, Andong, North Gyeongsang Province. The village is a UNESCO World Heritage Site, the dance-drama an Important Intangible Cultural Property, and a collection of thirteen (13) masks are a National Treasure. The ritual shares some of the major themes of Korean masked drama and Korean shamanism, namely satire and the ridicule of apostate Buddhist priests and the nobility.

== Ritual ==
The annual village fertility rites known as dong-je include the reading of charms and prayers, but no masked drama. The special ritual of byeolsingut talnori or pyŏlsin kut-nori is performed irregularly at the end of December and early January in order to appease the deity Seonangsin. It has a five-hundred year history and has been designated an Important Intangible Cultural Property (No. 69, designated 1980). After a period of purification and confinement, there is a procession that is followed by the masked dance-drama, in eight main episodes (madang):

(1) Shaman episode (Mudong madang)
(2) Lion episode (Juji madang)
(3) Butcher's episode (Baekjeong madang)
(4) Old widow's episode (Halmi madang)
(5) Apostate monk’s episode (Pagyeseong madang)
(6) Nobleman and scholar’s episode (Yangban and Seonbi madang)
(7) Wedding ceremony episode (Holrye madang)
(8) Wedding night’s episode (Sinbang madang)

The dance-drama, with musical accompaniment, exhibits considerable ribaldry, with the lions fighting and simulating intercourse; the butcher acting out the sacrifice of a bull before try to sell its heart and testicles; the old widow at the loom sadly singing of her solitary life; the lecherous, apostate monk stumbling upon Pune, a flirtatious young woman or dancing girl, while she micturates and, aroused, sniffing the ground before running off with her; the nobleman and scholar attempting to win Pune's favours by boasting of their good-breeding and learning, while she flirts with each in turn by killing his lice, before the proceedings are interrupted by a tax-collector; followed by the reenactment of a wedding ceremony and the ensuing wedding night that is so lifelike that minors and women are not allowed to watch.

== Masks ==
Eleven masks (11) from Hahoe and two from the neighbouring village of Byeongsan have been designated a National Treasure (No. 121, designated 1964). While festival masks are typically made from a gourd or paper, and are often burned after the festivities are over, these masks are of painted alder wood, with movable jaws separately attached with a cord. The eleven surviving Hahoe masks – others are believed lost, including that of the bachelor (Chonggak) – include the two lions (Juji), butcher (Baekjeong), old widow (Halmi), the depraved monk (Chung), flirtatious young woman (Pune), nobleman (Yangban), scholar (Seonbi), bride (Gaksi), meddling low-class merchant (Choraengi), and fool (Imae). The masks are now to be found in the Hahoe Mask Museum.

== See also ==
- Important Intangible Cultural Properties of Korea
- National Treasures of South Korea
- Korean shamanism
- List of World Heritage Sites in South Korea
- Intangible cultural heritage
