= Hahoe Folk Village =

UNESCO World Heritage Site in South Korea

Hahoe Village
UNESCO World Heritage Site
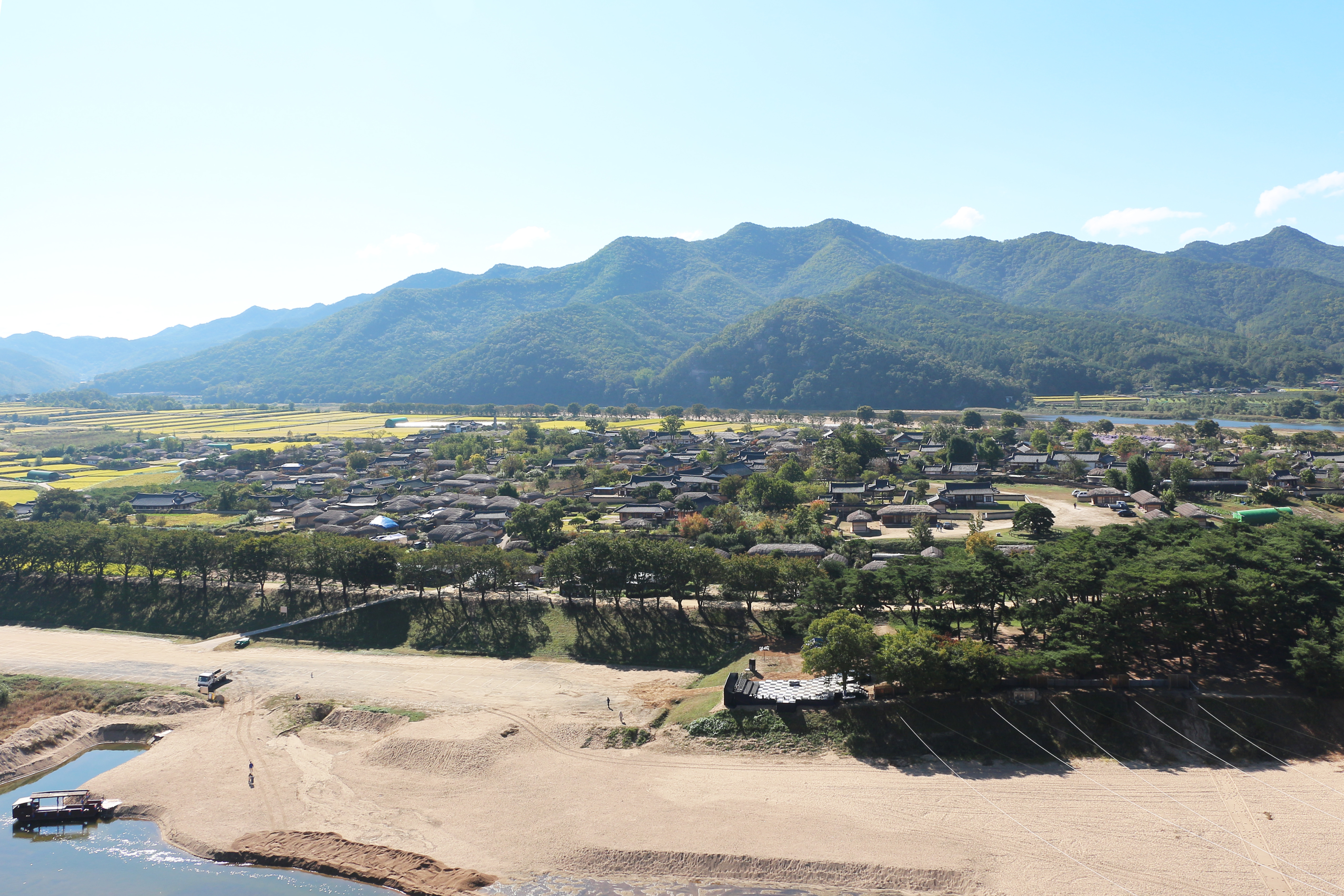
- Hahoe Village

- Location within South Korea
- Location: Andong, South Korea
- Part of: Historic Villages of Korea: Hahoe and Yangdong
- Criteria: Cultural: (iii), (iv)
- Reference: 1324-001
- Inscription: 2010 (34th Session)
- Area: 500 ha (1,200 acres)
- Website: www.hahoe.or.kr
- Coordinates: 36°32′21″N 128°31′0″E

Korean name
- Hangul: 안동 하회마을
- Hanja: 安東河回마을
- RR: Andong Hahoe maeul
- MR: Andong Hahoe maŭl

The Hahoe Folk Village (Korean: 안동 하회마을) is a traditional village from the Joseon Dynasty, located in Andong, North Gyeongsang Province, South Korea. The 'Ha' is short for river and 'hoe' means to 'turn around, return, come back.

The village is a valuable part of Korean culture because it preserves Joseon period-style architecture, folk traditions, valuable books, and an old tradition of clan-based villages. It is listed by the South Korean government with UNESCO as a World Heritage Site with Yangdong Folk Village in 2010 and attracts around 1 million visitors every year.

== Overview ==
Founded in the 14th-15th century, Hahoe, along with Yangdong, is one of the most highly-regarded historic villages centered around closely-linked families in South Korea. The settlement include the residences of the families, pavilions, Confucian academies and study pavilions that reflect the aristocratic Confucian culture of the early Joseon era. Within the village, six houses out of 124 have been designated as National Treasures.

To the north of the village is Buyongdae Cliff while Mt. Namsan lies to the south. The village is organized around the geomantic guidelines of pungsu (Korean feng shui) and so the village has the shape of a lotus flower or two interlocking comma shapes.

== History ==
The Ryu (or Yu in some transcriptions) clan of Pungsan established the Hahoe Folk Village in the 15th century during the Joseon Dynasty and has been a one-clan community since that time. The village is notable because it has preserved many of its original structures, such as the village Confucian school and other buildings, and maintains folk arts such as the Hahoe Mask Dance Drama ('Byeonlsin-gut') which is a shamanist rite honoring the communal spirits of the village.

The village today is divided into Namchon (South Village) and Pukchon (North Village) with the main branch of the Pungsan Ryu clan, the Gyeomampa, in the Namchon side and the secondary branch, the Seoaepa, descended from Yu Sŏngnyong a noted prime minister during the reign of King Seonjo of Joseon in the Bukchon side. The north village contains Yangjindang Manor, designated as Treasure No. 306, and Pikchondaek House, designated Important Folklore Material No. 84. The south village contains Chunghyodang Manor, designated as Treasure No. 414 and Namchondaek House, an Important Folklore Material No. 90. While each branch of the Pungsan Ryu clan used lived in their respective manor homes and sides, today both branches live throughout the village.

The village maintains old architectural styles that have been lost because of rapid modernization and development in South Korea. Aristocratic tile-roofed residences and thatched-roof servants' homes preserve the architectural styles of the Joseon Dynasty. Wonjijeongsa Pavilion and Byeongsan Confucian School are two notable structures in the village. The village has preserved the shamanist rite of Byeolsin-gut and preserved Hahoe masks used in the Hahoe Mask Dance. Another rite still practiced is the Jeulbul Nori which uses strings of fireworks fired at the base of the Buyongdae Cliff. Yongmogak Shrine houses Yu Sŏngnyong's collection of books and includes South Korean National Treasure No. 132, the Jingbirok, a book which records the Imjin War of Korea in 1592. Treasure No. 160, Kunmundungok, is a record of the military encampments. Chunghyodang also holds 231 royal writs of appointment.

Inside the village there is a 650-year-old zelkova tree called Samsindan said to be home to the goddess Samsin, in Korean Shamanism. Visitors write their wishes on pieces of paper and hang them next to the tree.

Queen Elizabeth II visited Hahoe Village in 1999. During her visit, locals in the village had a party to celebrate her 73rd birthday.

== Intangible cultural asset ==
=== Hahoe Byeolsingut Mask Play ===
The mask play, which has been staged in Hahoe-ri, Pungcheon-myeon, Andong City, North Gyeongsang Province, is National Intangible Cultural Treasure No. 69. The origin of this mask play is Seonangje's mask dance, which is an involuntary dramatic victory observed in Dongje, unlike Sandae Myeonghwajeon, a Korean traditional mask play. Byeolsingut Tal Nori is a mask play that is included in the overall village rite, and is a mixture of ritual, folk opera and pantomime.

=== Sunyu Line Fire ===
'Sunyu Line Fire' is a folk game in which people hang a bag filled with charcoal powder on a long string hanging in the air and enjoy a spectacular event in which flames leapt through the air. In Andong's Hahoe Village, the aristocrats took a poem and went out on the river where they sang and enjoyed the poem under the full moon in July. At this time, they enjoyed pouring oil on egg shells or buppy pieces and flying them with a wick, or dropping pine tree stems that had been lit at Buyongdae.

== Tourism ==
Hahoe Folk Village has been listed as a World Heritage Site since 2010 and attracts more than 1 million visitors a year.

It has been cited by the Ministry of Culture, Sports and Tourism and the Korea Tourism Organization as one of the '100 Must-Visit Tourist Spots in Korea,' every year from 2013 until 2025, except for 2016-2017.

Since 2021, tour carts have been forbidden from entering the site in order to preserve the village.

== Gallery ==
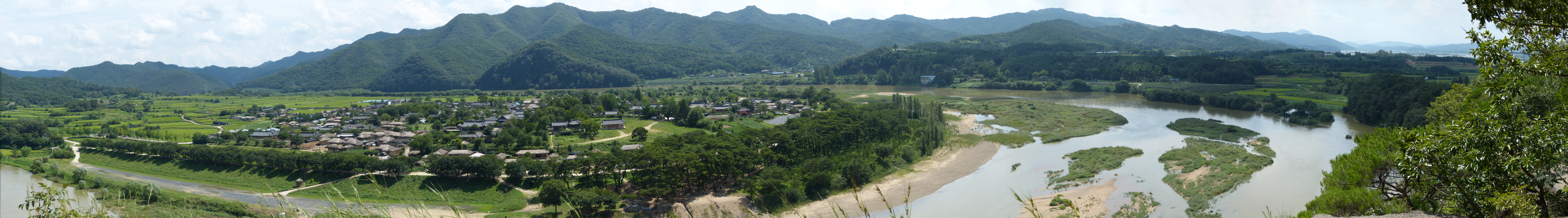
Panoramic view of the village and the Nakdong River around it
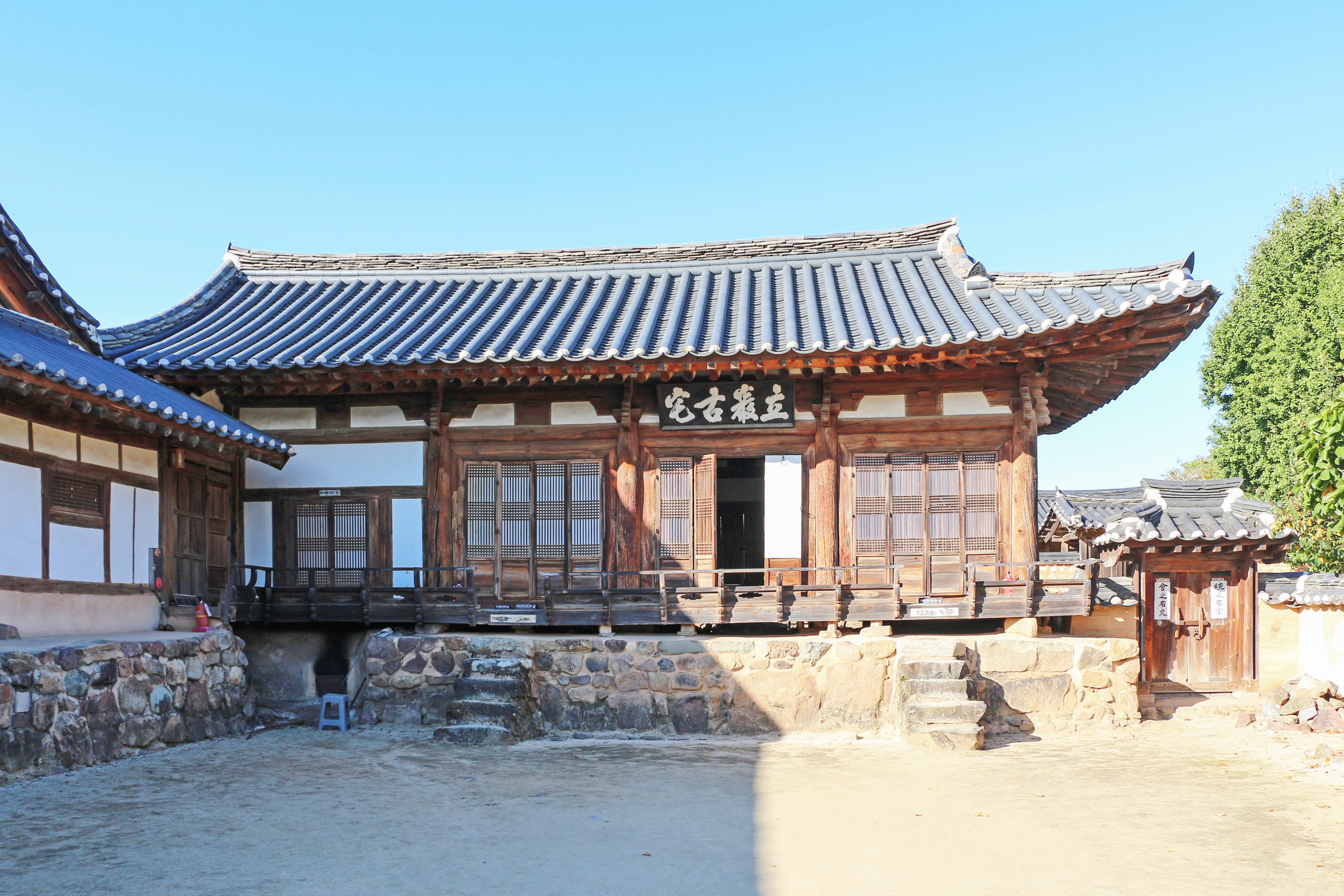
Yangjin Residence

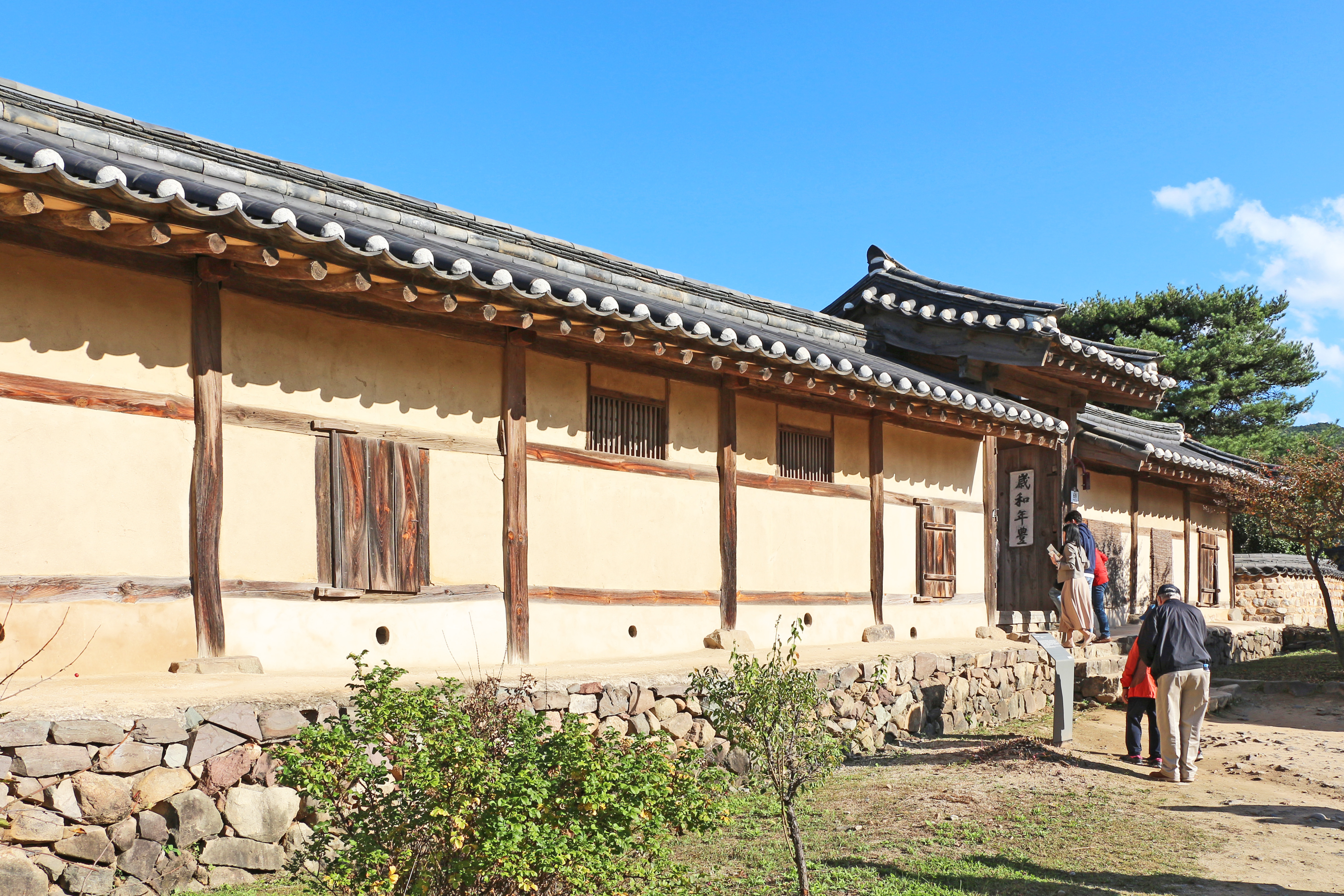
Chunghyo Residence

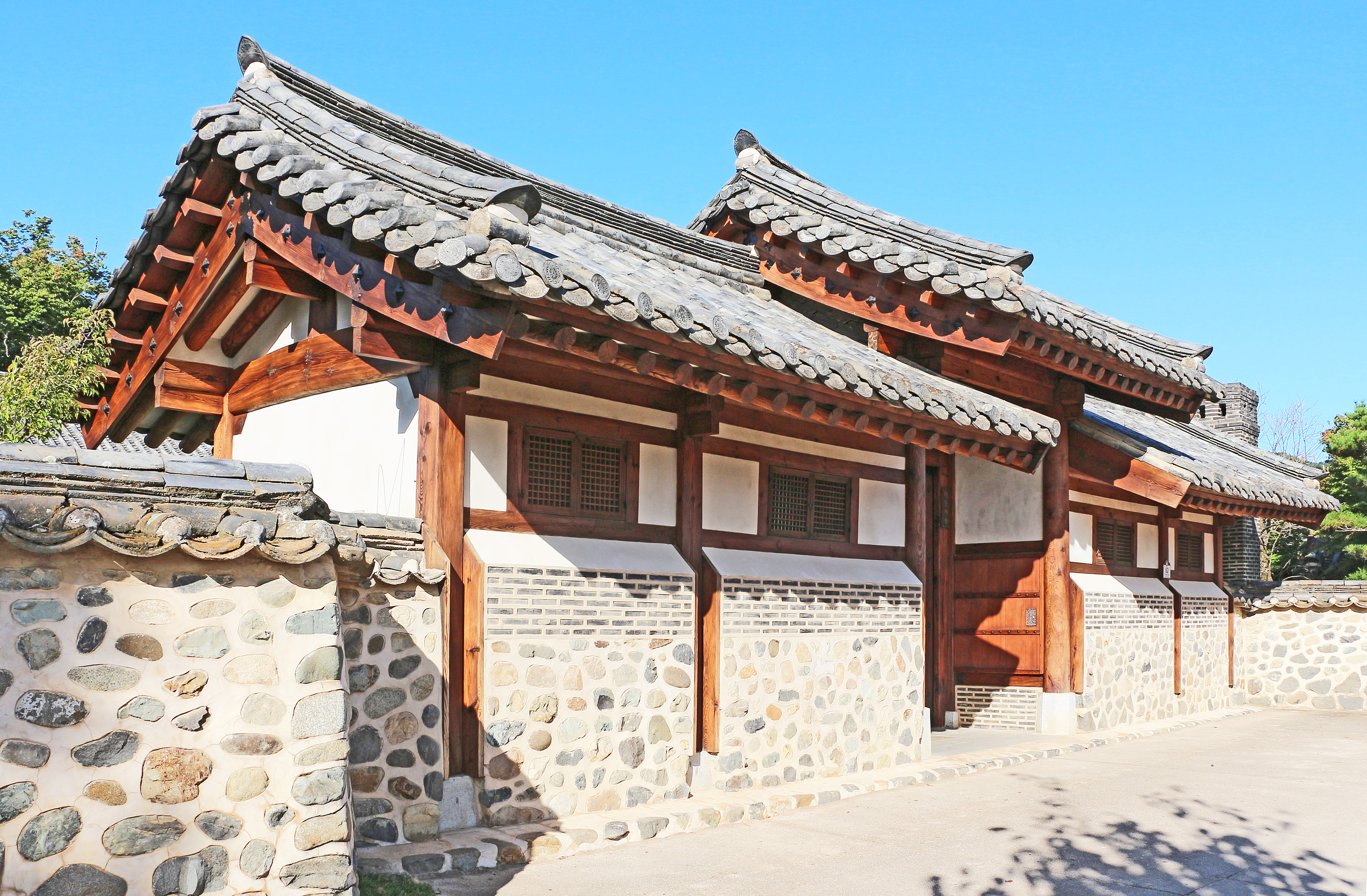
House in Hahoe Village

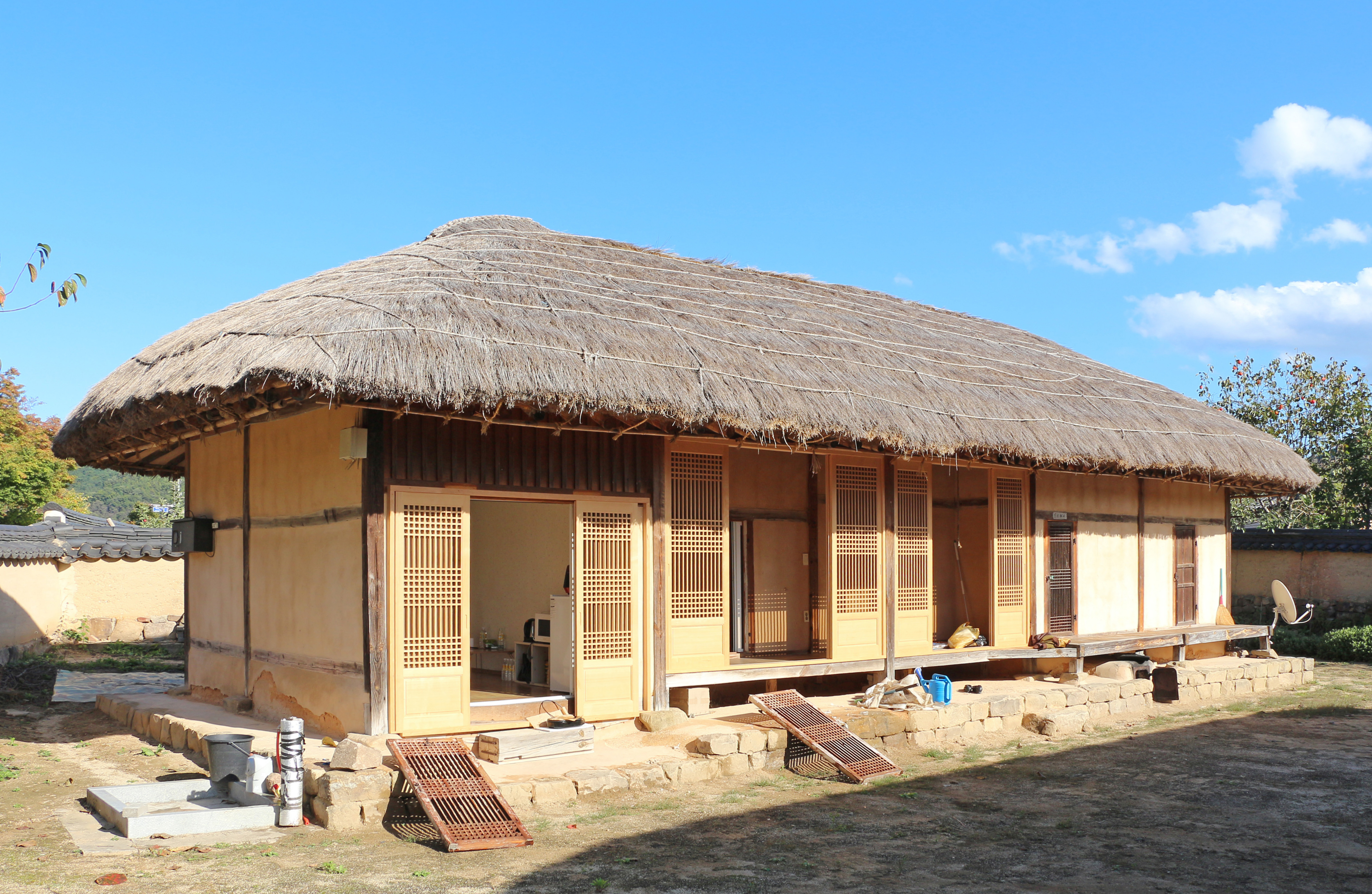
House in Hahoe Village

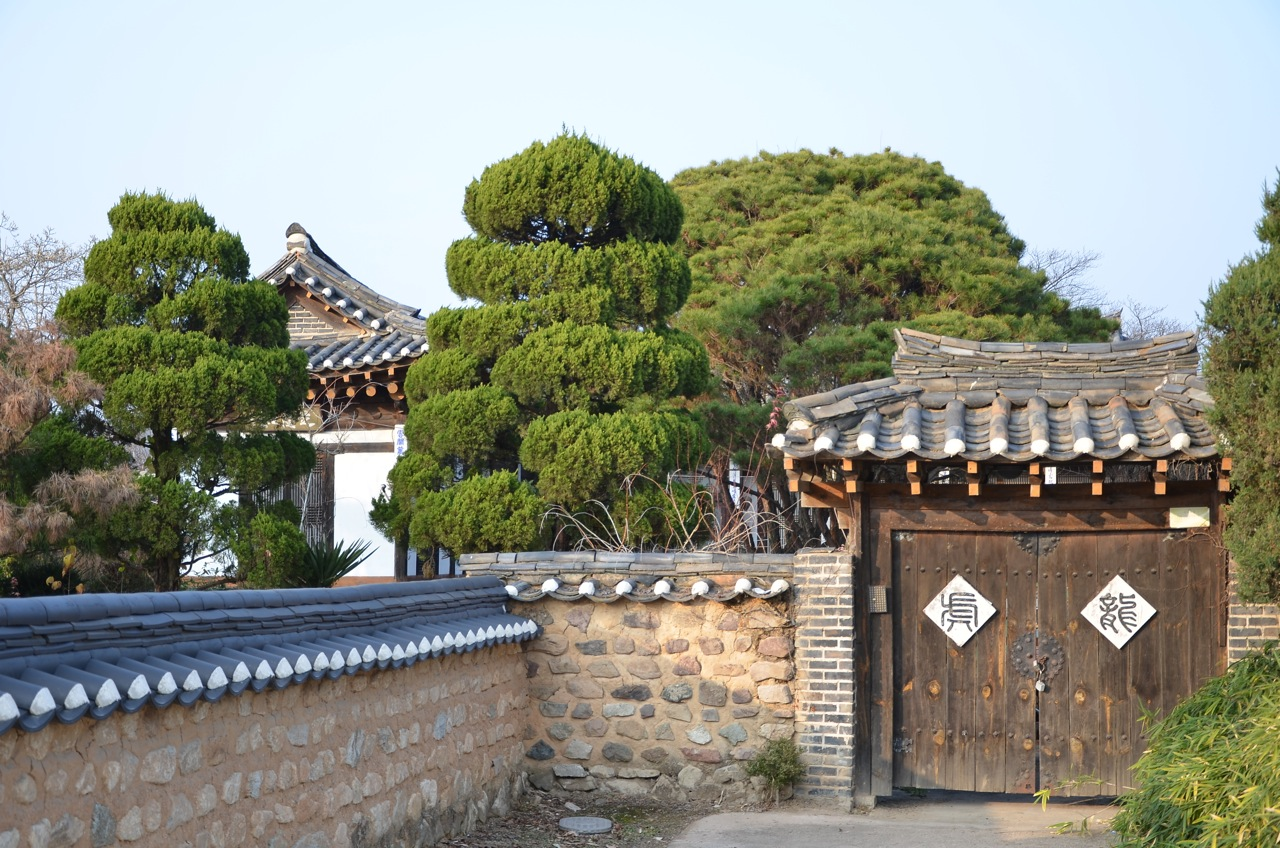
House in Hahoe Village

== See also ==
- Yandong Folk Village, Gyeongju.
