= Songpasandae-nori =

Type of Korean mask play

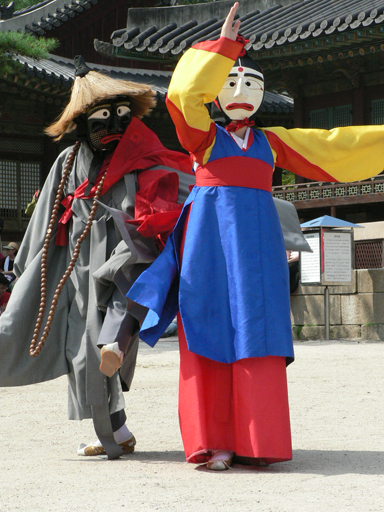

Korean name
- Hunminjeongeum: 송파산대놀이
- Hanja: 松坡山臺놀이
- Revised Romanization: Songpa Sandae Noli
- McCune–Reischauer: Songp'a santae nori

Songpasandae-nori (Korean: 송파산대놀이) is a Korean traditional mask dance handed down in Songpa District, Seoul. It was designated as Important Intangible Cultural Properties of Korea in 1973 and UNESCO Intangible Cultural Heritage in 2022 as "Talchum, Mask Dance Drama in the Republic of Korea".

Sandae-nori is a mask dance that developed in Seoul and mid metropolitan region. Songpasandae-nori preserves the original form of Joseon Dynasty sandae-nori. Unlike Yangju byeolsandae nori, there are dangnyeo, Haesaneomeom, Sinhalmeom, and mudang masks.

== History ==
Songpa was a commercial hub of the Gyeonggi region. In the 19th century, when the Songpa Market was at its peak, sandae-nori was established. In 1925 when Songpa Village was lost due to the great flood of the Han River, residents settled in Garak-dong and Seokchon-dong and continued the dance.

Songpasandae-nori was performed during holidays such as Jeongwol daeboreum, Dano, Baekjung and Chuseok. During Baekjung, famous performers were invited to perform for a week. It was also performed in the royal court.

It is currently taught and preserved at Seoul Nori Madang located near Seokchon Lake.

== Composition ==
=== Preparation ===
Songpasandae-nori begins with a cheerful parade called georigut (거리굿) or gilnori (길놀이), circling around the Songpa Market and nearby town in order to attract people to their performance. When parading, they wore masks and costumes, and played a type of marching music, gilgunak (길군악). With a decorative small flag used by farmers or yeonggi (영기, 令旗) at the head, the performers followed the musicians in procession. After the parade, they used an amulet to ward off misfortune and to wish everyone in the market to have good health and fortune.

The performers hold a seomakgosa (서막고사), a kind of jesa (sacrificial rite), before the dance begins. Masks used for the coming performance are placed on a table setting for the jesa along with several varieties of food, and performers pour alcoholic beverages into a bowl and bow toward the table. This rite is to honor the dead and wish them to rest in peace, as well as to expect to have a good performance.

=== Story ===
It consists of 7 acts called gwajang (과장) or madang (마당). It candidly depicts conflicts between classes and human nature.

1. Sangjwachumnori (상좌춤놀이): Two monks enter the stage and perform a dance.
2. Omjungmeokjung (옴중먹중놀이): An apostate monk tries to ridicule the others but is eventually humiliated. It criticizes monks tainted by secular influences.
3. Yeonnip and Nunkkeumjeogi (연잎과 눈끔적이): Noblemen are unable to take the government examination because of their physical appearance, which shocks the Buddhist monks. It mocks the arrogance of yangban.
4. Palmeokjung (팔먹중)
  1. Aesadangbuknori (애사당북놀이): Monks' dance accompanied by small drums
  2. Gonjangnori (곤장놀이): Eight monks follow a devout monk who is determined to teach them Buddhist scriptures. However, they show no interest in studying.
  3. Chimnori (침놀이): One of the eight monks suddenly develops a stomachache. When the others fail to cure him, a doctor treats him with acupuncture.
5. Nojang (노장): An old monk tries to flirt with a young woman.
  1. Pagyeseungnori (파계승놀이)
  2. Sinjangsunori (신장수놀이)
  3. Chwibarinori (취발이놀이)
6. Saennim (샌님)
  1. Uimaksaryeongnori (의막사령놀이): A nobleman orders his servant to build a pigsty but the servant mocks him by calling his family “noble pigs.”
  2. Miyalhalminori (미얄할미놀이)
  3. Podobujangnori (포도부장놀이)
7. Sinharabeoji and Sinhalmi (신할아버지와 신할미): As an old man flirts with a young woman, his wife dies because of his curse, which is followed by an exorcism performed by their children.

There is a total of 33 masks.

== Gallery ==
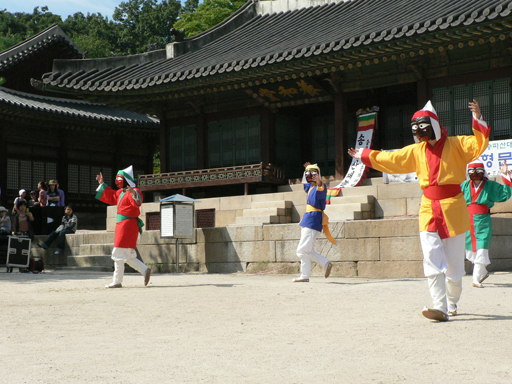

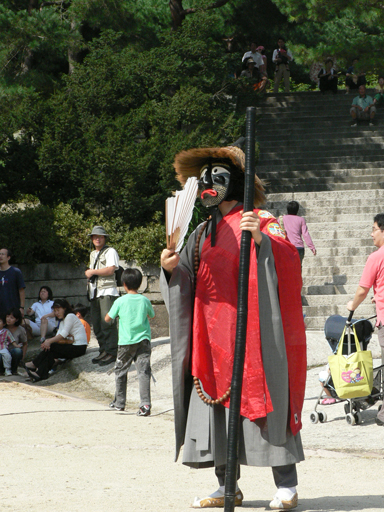

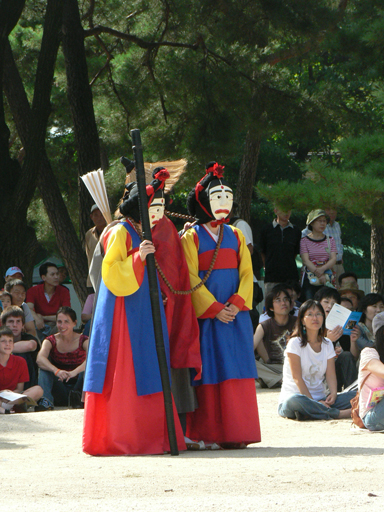

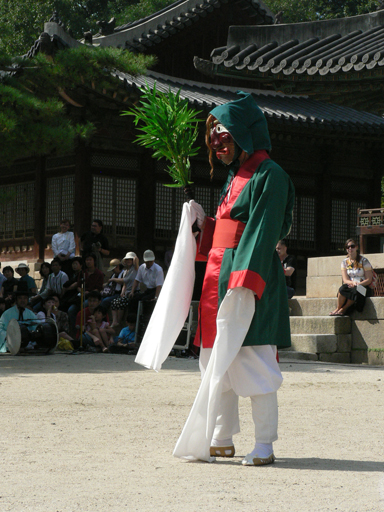

== See also ==
- Talchum
- Namsadang nori
- Important Intangible Cultural Properties of Korea
