= Yangju byeolsandae nori =

Korean traditional mask drama

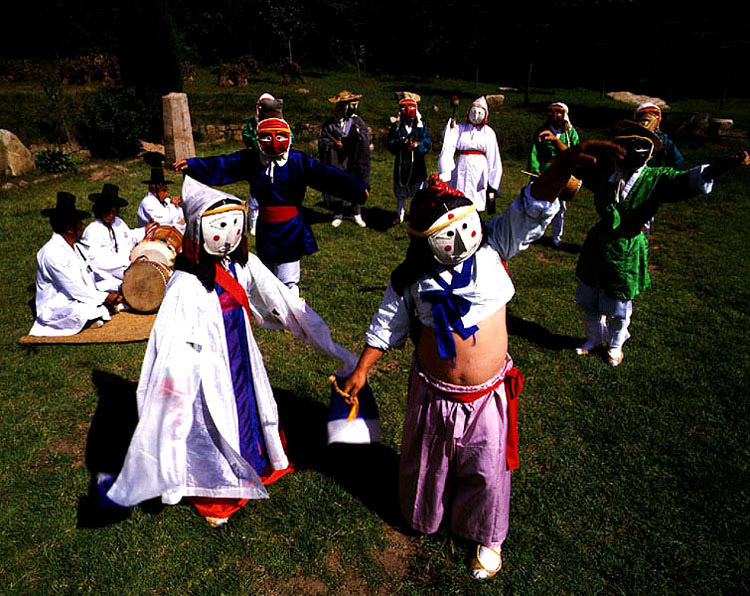
- Yangju byeolsandae nori

Korean name
- Hangul: 양주별산대놀이
- Hanja: 楊州別山臺놀이
- Revised Romanization: Yangju byeolsandae nori
- McCune–Reischauer: Yangju pyŏlsandae nori

Yangju byeolsandae nori (Korean: 양주별산대놀이) is Korea's traditional mask drama, registered as an Important Intangible Cultural Properties of Korea. It is performed primarily in April (chopail), May (danoh), July (Basin) and August (Thanksgiving) and also sometimes in a ceremony which prays for rain. The name originates from the place where mask-playing started, Yangju province in Korea. It was the first mask play to be designated as an "Important Intangible Cultural Property".

== History ==
According to the Korean official culture information service, Yangju byeolsandae nori was started by government officials working in Yangju province. In Yangju, a group of entertainers called Ttakttakyipae from Hanyang came to perform every April and May but they frequently broke their promise and failed to put on a show. As a result, the officials in Yangju started to make their own mask drama and hold performances. Lee Eul-chuk was the main organiser of the show and the first to produce mask dramas in Yangju. At that time, Yangju was both a big town and transport hub, and also a city with many officials. So the Yangju byeolsandae nori become the special play that was performed by people living near the Yangju office. Sandae nori is also called "sandi nori", "sanji nori" or "sandu nori" and originated from "sandae gabhee", a welcoming ceremony for Chinese diplomats. It spread mainly from Seoul and Gyeonggi Province to Aeohgae (now Ahyeon-dong), Manrijae, Gameundol (now Heukseokdong), Nokbeon, Sajikgol, Gupabal, Nodes (now Noryangjin), Toegyewon and Uijeongbu but it is not performed in these regions any more.

== Procedures ==
Before the mask drama starts, a ceremony takes place praying for a good performance and traditional foods are served. These include jora, tteok and fruits organized in three colors, head of beef and leg of pork. Usually rich people and merchants in town paid the cost of the show and the performers were unpaid. The performance took place at Sagikgol, which is to the north of Mount Bulgok in the town. There had been a shaman house there and props needed for the show were placed inside. There were no rules as to the exact times of performances but they usually started in the evening and ended at dawn the following day. Occasionally, it was shortened to three or four hours. The main instruments used in the performance were two piri (flute), one jeotdae, one haegeum, one janggu and one buk which are all traditional Korean instruments. Kkwaenggari was added when it was needed and sometimes players danced with only piri and janggu. They used the rhythms of taryong or gutgurigok and the dance style was divided into geodeureumsik and kkaekkisik. Yangju byeolsandae nori is organized with mainly dancing to music like other talchum, and it is divided into dance performance, miming and drama where the actors have set lines. The traditional characters include Sangjwa, lotus and nunkkeumjjeokyi, waejangnyeo, aesadang, somu, veteran, monkeys, haesanmo, podo Director and miyal grandma. Some roles do not have any words so only dancing and gesture are required but other roles have lines as well as dance and gesture. The typical Bongsan Talchum is in verse but in Yangju byeolsandae nori, the lines are in prose.

== Characters ==
Yangju byeolsandae nori is organized with 32 characters but as some masks are used in two or three ways, only 22 masks are used during the performance. The 22 characters are two Sangjwa, scabies, four mokjung, yeonip, nunkkeumjjeokyi, wanbo, sinjubu, waejangnyeo, nojang, two Somu, maltuki, monkeys, Chwibari, one sanim, podo Director, sinhalahbi and miyal grandma.
