= List of Intangible Cultural Heritage elements in South Korea =

The United Nations Educational, Scientific and Cultural Organisation (UNESCO) intangible cultural heritage elements are the non-physical traditions and practices performed by a people. As part of a country's cultural heritage, they include celebrations, festivals, performances, oral traditions, music, and the making of handicrafts. The "intangible cultural heritage" is defined by the Convention for the Safeguarding of Intangible Cultural Heritage, drafted in 2003 and took effect in 2006. Inscription of new heritage elements on the UNESCO Intangible Cultural Heritage Lists is determined by the Intergovernmental Committee for the Safeguarding of Intangible Cultural Heritage, an organisation established by the convention.

South Korea ratified the convention on 9 February 2005. The government of South Korea also keeps an inventory with the elements declared "Important Intangible Cultural Property" (중요무형문화재) for protection and safeguard by the Korea Heritage Service (국가유산청) at the national level within its heritage preservation system.

== Intangible Cultural Heritage of Humanity ==
+ Transnational element

=== Representative List ===
Name	Image	Year	No.	Description
Gangneung Danoje festival		2008	00114	Gangneung Danoje (강릉단오제), called by locals Danogut (단오굿), is a yearly celebration of the Korean holiday Dano (단오), in Gangneung (Gangwon province).
Pansori epic chant		2008	00070	Pansori (판소리) is a Korean genre of musical storytelling performed by a singer and a drummer.
Royal ancestral ritual in the Jongmyo shrine and its music		2008	00016	Jongmyo jerye (종묘제례) or jongmyo daeje (종묘대제) is a traditional rite held for worshipping the deceased Joseon monarchs in Jongmyo shrine in Seoul. It is held every year on the first Sunday of May.
Cheoyongmu		2009	00189	Cheoyongmu (처용무) is a Korean mask dance based on the legend of Cheoyong (처용), a son of the Dragon King of the Eastern Sea.
Ganggangsullae		2009	00188	Ganggangsullae (강강술래) is an ancient Korean dance that was first used to bring about a bountiful harvest. It incorporates singing, dancing, and playing and is exclusively performed by women.
Jeju Chilmeoridang Yeongdeunggut		2009	00187	Jeju Chilmeoridang Yeongdeunggut (제주 칠머리당영등굿) is a shaman ritual that is held on Jeju Island at the start of the Korean New Year.
Yeongsanjae		2009	00186	Yeongsanjae (영산재) is a Buddhist ceremony which re-enacts Siddhartha Gautama delivering the sermon now known as the Lotus Sutra.
Namsadang Nori		2009	00184	Namsadang (남사당) is an itinerant troupe which consists of male performers who present various performing arts such as acrobatics, singing, dancing, and playing like a circus.
Daemokjang, traditional wooden architecture		2010	00461	Daemokjang (대목장) is a style of traditional Korean wooden architecture and a term for the woodworking artisans who create it.
Gagok, lyric song cycles accompanied by an orchestra		2010	00444	Gagok (가곡) is a genre of Korean vocal music for mixed female and male voices.
Weaving of Mosi (fine ramie) in the Hansan region		2011	00453	Hansan Mosi (한산모시), a fine ramie weaved fabric made in Hansan area of Seocheon County in the province of South Chungcheong, is a traditional textile.
Taekkyeon, a traditional Korean martial art		2011	00452	Taekkyon (태껸; 택견), is a traditional Korean martial art.
Jultagi, tightrope walking		2011	00448	Jultagi (줄타기) or eoreum (어름) is traditional performance of tightrope walking.
Arirang, lyrical folk song in the Republic of Korea		2012	00445	Arirang (아리랑) is a Korean folk song.
Kimjang, making and sharing kimchi in the Republic of Korea		2013	00881	Gimjang (김장), also spelled kimjang, is the traditional process of preparation and preservation of kimchi, the spicy Korean fermented vegetable dish, in the wintertime.
Nongak, community band music, dance and rituals in the Republic of Korea		2014	00717	Pungmul (풍물) or nongak is a Korean folk music tradition that includes drumming, dancing, and singing.
Tugging rituals and games + (Note: Shared with Cambodia, the Philippines, and Vietnam.)		2015	01080	Tugging rituals and games in the rice-farming cultures are enacted to ensure abundant harvests and prosperity.
Culture of Jeju Haenyeo (women divers)		2016	01068	Haenyeo (해녀) are female divers in the province of Jeju, whose livelihood consists of harvesting a variety of mollusks, seaweed, and other sea life from the ocean.
Traditional Korean wrestling (Ssirum/Ssireum) + (Note: Shared with North Korea.)		2018	01533	Ssireum (씨름) or Korean wrestling is a folk wrestling style and traditional national sport that began in the fourth century.
Yeondeunghoe, lantern lighting festival in the Republic of Korea		2020	00882	Yeondeunghoe (연등회) is a lantern-lighting festival celebrating the Buddha's Birthday.
Falconry, a living human heritage + (Note: Shared with Austria, Belgium, Croatia, Czechia, France, Germany, Hungary, Ireland, Italy, Kazakhstan, Kyrgyzstan, Mongolia, Morocco, Netherlands, Pakistan, Poland, Portugal, Qatar, Saudi Arabia, Slovakia, Spain, Syria, and the United Arab Emirates.)		2021	01708	
Talchum, mask dance drama in the Republic of Korea		2022	01742	Talchum (탈춤) is a Korean dance performed while wearing a mask, and often involves singing and dancing.
Knowledge, beliefs and practices related to jang making in the Republic of Korea		2024	01975	Jang is a variety of Korean condiments, such as ganjang, doenjang, and gochujang.

== See also ==
- List of World Heritage Sites in South Korea
- National Intangible Cultural Heritage (South Korea)
