= Yeongsan (disambiguation) =

Yeongsan (Korean: 영산) is a myeon of Changnyeong County, South Gyeongsang Province, in South Korea.

Yeongsan may also refer to:

- Yeongsan River, a river in south-western South Korea.
- Yeongsan soemeoridaegi, a traditional game in Korea.
- Yeongsan hoesang, a Korean court music repertoire originated from Buddhist music.
- Yeongsan Shin clan, one of the Korean clans.
- Prince Yeongsan, a prince of the Joseon Dynasty.

== See also ==
- Yeonsan (disambiguation)
- Battle of Yongsan
