= Pungeoje =

Korean fishing rites

Pungeoje (Korean: 풍어제; Hanja: 豊漁祭) is a term used for a number of traditional Korean rites related to fishing. In seaside communities, rituals to summon aid from guardian spirits, send off boats, encourage a bounteous catch and ensure a safe return to harbour are still practiced. Often these rituals involve music and dancing, and forms of traditional Korean theatre. Pungeoje is one of the Important Intangible Cultural Properties of Korea.

In the south and east, the most common rite is the byeolsin-gut, a two-part ceremony with both Confucian and shamanistic elements which is intended to placate the spirits of the village. In the west, particularly in Hwanghae, the favoured rite is the daedong-gut, a communal event involving dancing and masked drama. In some areas, such as Incheon, the two are performed together, the byeolsin-gut on a boat in order to improve the catch, and the daedon-gut on land to ensure the good health and prosperity of the village.
