= Yeonsan =

Yeonsan or Yŏnsan may refer to:

- Yeonsangun of Joseon (1476–1506), Joseon king
- Prince Yeonsan (film), a 1961 South Korean film directed by Shin Sang-ok
- Yonsan County, a county in North Hwanghae Province, North Korea
- Yeonsan-myeon, a township of Nonsan, South Chungcheong Province, South Korea
- Yeonsan County, the former county in Chungcheong Province, Korea to 1914

== See also ==
- Yeonsan Station (disambiguation)
- Yeongsan (disambiguation)
