= Important Intangible Cultural Property =

The term Important Cultural Property may refer to:

- Important Intangible Cultural Properties of South Korea
- Important Intangible Cultural Properties of Japan
