= National Intangible Cultural Heritage (South Korea) =

Korean traditions and customs

- Hangul: 국가무형문화재
- Hanja: 國家無形文化財
- RR: Gukga muhyeong munhwajae
- MR: Kukka muhyŏng munhwajae

National Intangible Cultural Heritage (Korean: 국가무형문화재) is a national-level designation within the heritage preservation system of South Korea for intangible cultural heritage. This and other national-level designations are maintained by South Korea's Cultural Heritage Administration (CHA).

There is a separate local-level designation called "Intangible Cultural Properties". That designation is administered by provinces or cities rather than by the CHA.

Practices of particular importance can be designated as Important Intangible Cultural Properties (중요무형문화재).

== History ==
The 1962 Cultural Property Protection Law that governs the system was modelled on the Japanese 1950 Law for the Protection of Cultural Properties, which provides for the designation of Intangible Cultural Properties as well as the holders of these craft and performance traditions, known informally as Living National Treasures. These early initiatives at a national level influenced UNESCO in its approach to intangible cultural heritage, leading to the 2003 Convention for the Safeguarding of Intangible Cultural Heritage. As of 2025, twenty-three South Korean Intangible Cultural elements have been inscribed on the UNESCO Representative List of the Intangible Cultural Heritage of Humanity.

== List ==
No. (Note: On November 19, 2021, the Cultural Heritage Administration removed the numbering system for all of its designations. Previously assigned numbers are preserved here for the sake of reference.)	Image	Official names (Note: (English, Hangul, Hanja/mixed script))	Location	Dates	Refs
1		Jongmyo jeryeak Royal Ancestral Ritual Music in the Jongmyo Shrine 종묘제례악 宗廟祭禮樂	Seoul area	1964-12-07	
2		Yangju byeolsandae nori Mask Dance Drama of Yangju 양주별산대놀이 楊州別山臺놀이	Gyeonggi area	1964-12-07	
3		Namsadang nori Itinerant Troupe Performance 남사당놀이 男寺黨놀이	Seoul area	1964-12-07	
4		Gannil; Horsehair Hat Making 갓일	N/A	1964-12-24	
5		Pansori; Epic Chant 판소리	N/A	1964-12-24	
6		Tongyeong ogwangdae Mask Dance Drama of Tongyeong 통영오광대 統營五廣大	South Gyeongsang area	1964-12-24	
7		Goseong ogwangdae Mask Dance Drama of Goseong 고성오광대 固城五廣大	South Gyeongsang area	1964-12-24	
8		Ganggangsullae; Circle Dance 강강술래	South Jeolla area	1966-02-15	
9		Eunsan byeolsinje Village Ritual of Eunsan 은산별신제 恩山別神祭	South Chungcheong area	1966-02-15	
10		Najeonjang; Mother-of-pearl Inlaying 나전장 螺鈿匠	N/A	1966-06-29	
11-1		Jinju samcheonpo nongak Farmers' Performance of Samcheonpo, Jinju 진주삼천포농악 晋州三千浦農樂	South Gyeongsang area	1966-06-29	
11-2		Pyeongtaek nongak Farmers' Performance of Pyeongtaek 평택농악 平澤農樂	Gyeonggi area	1985-12-01	
11-3		Iri nongak Farmers' Performance of Iri 이리농악 裡里農樂	North Jeolla area	1985-12-01	
11-4		Gangneung nongak Farmers' Performance of Gangneung 강릉농악 江陵農樂	Gangwon area	1985-12-01	
11-5		Imsil pilbong nongak Farmers' Performance of Pilbong, Imsil 임실필봉농악 任實筆峰農樂	North Jeolla area	1988-08-01	
11-6		Gurye jansu nongak Farmers' Performance of Jansu, Gurye 구례잔수농악 求禮潺水農樂	South Jeolla area	2010-10-21	
11-7		Gimcheon geumneung binnae nongak Farmers' Performance of Binnae Village, Gimcheon 김천금릉빗내농악	경북 김천시 개령면 빗내길 118	2019-09-02	
11-8		Namwon nongak Farmers' Performance of Namwon 남원농악	전북 남원시 술미안길 14-19	2019-09-02	
12		Jinju geommu Sword Dance of Jinju 진주검무 晋州劍舞	South Gyeongsang area	1967-01-16	
13		Gangneung Danoje; Dano Festival of Gangneung 강릉단오제 江陵端午祭	Gangwon area	1967-01-16	
14		Hansan mosi jjagi Fine Ramie Weaving of Hansan 한산모시짜기 韓山모시짜기	South Chungcheong area	1967-01-16	
15		Bukcheong sajanoreum Lion Mask Dance of Bukcheong 북청사자놀음 北靑獅子놀음	Seoul area	1967-03-31	
16		Geomungo sanjo Free-style Geomungo Solo Music 거문고산조 거문고散調	Seoul area	1967-06-16	
17		Bongsan talchum Mask Dance Drama of Bongsan 봉산탈춤 鳳山탈춤	Seoul area	1967-06-16	
18		Dongnae yaryu Mask Dance Drama of Dongnae 동래야류 東萊野遊	Busan area	1967-12-21	
19		Seonsori santaryeong Folk Song of the Mountain Performed in a Standing Position 선소리산타령 선소리山打令	Seoul area	1968-04-18	
20		Daegeum jeongak Classical Daegeum Solo Music 대금정악 大笒正樂	Seoul area	1968-12-21	
21		Seungjeonmu; Victory Dance 승전무 勝戰舞	South Gyeongsang area	1968-12-21	
22		Maedeupjang; Decorative Knotting 매듭장 매듭匠	Gyeonggi Province	1968-12-21	
23		Gayageum sanjo mit byeongchang Free-style Gayageum Solo and Music and Singing 가야금산조및병창 伽倻琴散調및倂唱	N/A	1968-12-21	
24		Andong chajeon nori Chariot Battle of Andong 안동차전놀이 安東車戰놀이	North Gyeongsang area	1969-01-07	
25		Yeongsan soemeori daegi Wooden Bull Fight of Yeongsan 영산쇠머리대기 靈山쇠머리대기	South Gyeongsang area	1969-02-11	
26		Yeongsan juldarigi Tug-of-war (juldarigi) of Yeongsan 영산줄다리기 靈山줄다리기	South Gyeongsang area	1969-02-11	
27		Seungmu; Monk's Dance 승무 僧舞	N/A	1969-07-04	
28		Naju saetgollai Cotton Weaving of Naju 나주의샛골나이 羅州의샛골나이	South Jeolla area	1969-07-04	
29		Seodo sori Folk Song of the Western Provinces 서도소리 西道소리	N/A	1969-09-27	
30	-->	Gagok; Lyric Song Cycles Accompanied by an Orchestra 가곡; 한국 음악 歌曲	N/A	1969-11-10	
31		Nakjukjang; Bamboo Pyrography 낙죽장 烙竹匠	South Jeolla area	1969-11-29	
32		Gokseong dolsillai Hemp Weaving of Gokseong 곡성의돌실나이 谷城의돌실나이	South Jeolla area	1970-07-22	
33		Gwangju chilseok gossaum nori Loop Fight of Gwangju 광주칠석고싸움놀이 광주칠석고싸움놀이	Gwangju area	1970-07-22	
34		Gangnyeong talchum Mask Dance Drama of Gangnyeong 강령탈춤 康翎탈춤	Seoul area	1970-07-22	
35		Jogakjang; Metal Engraving 조각장 彫刻匠	Seoul area	1970-07-22	
~~36~~		~~판소리심청가~~	~~Seoul area~~		
~~37~~		~~화장~~; ~~靴匠~~	~~Seoul area~~	1970-07-22, 1982-02-05 removed	
38		Joseon wangjo gungjung eumsik Royal Culinary Art of the Joseon Dynasty 조선왕조 궁중음식 朝鮮王朝宮中飮食	Seoul area	1970-12-30	
39		Cheoyongmu; Dance of Cheoyong 처용무 處容舞	Seoul area	1971-01-08	
40		Hak yeonhwadae hapseolmu Crane Dance and Lotus Flower Dance 학연화대합설무 鶴蓮花臺合設舞	Seoul area	1971-01-08	
41		Gasa; Narrative Song 가사 歌詞	Seoul area	1971-01-08	
42		Akgijang; Musical Instrument Making 악기장 樂器匠	N/A	1971-02-24	
43		Suyeong yaryu Mask Dance Drama of Suyeong 수영야류 水營野遊	Busan area	1971-02-24	
44		Gyeongsan jain danoje Dano Festival of Jain, Gyeongsan 경산자인단오제 慶山慈仁端午祭	North Gyeongsang area	1971-03-16	
45		Daegeum sanjo Free-style Daegeum Solo Music 대금산조 大笒散調	N/A	1971-03-16	
46		Piri jeongak mit daechwita Classical Piri Solo and Military Band Music 피리정악및대취타 피리정악및大吹打	Seoul area	1971-06-10	
47		Gungsijang; Bow and Arrow Making 궁시장 弓矢匠	N/A	1971-09-13	
48		Dancheongjang; Ornamental Painting 단청장 丹靑匠	N/A	1972-08-01	
49		Songpasandae-nori; Mask Dance Drama of Songpa 송파산대놀이 松坡山臺놀이	Seoul area	1973-11-11	
50		Yeongsanjae; Celebration of Buddha's Sermon on Vulture Peak Mountain 영산재 靈山齋	Seoul area	1973-11-05	
51		Namdo deullorae Farmers' Song of Jeollanam-do 남도들노래 南道들노래	South Jeolla area	1973-11-05	
~~52~~		~~Sinawi~~; ~~시나위~~	~~Seoul area~~	1973-11-05, 1975-05-03 removed	
53		Chaesangjang; Bamboo Case Weaving 채상장 彩箱匠	South Jeolla area	1975-01-29	
~~54~~		~~Kkeuneumjil~~; ~~끊음질~~	~~기타 전국~~	1975-01-29, 1995-03-16 removed	
55		Somokjang; Wood Furniture Making 소목장 小木匠	Gyeonggi area	1975-01-29	
56		Jongmyo jerye Royal Ancestral Ritual in the Jongmyo Shrine 종묘제례 宗廟祭禮	Seoul area	1975-05-03	
57		Gyeonggi minyo Folk Song of Gyeonggi Area 경기민요 京畿民謠	N/A	1975-07-12	
58		Jultagi; Tightrope Walking 줄타기 줄타기	Gyeonggi area	1976-06-30	
~~59~~		~~판소리고법~~; ~~판소리鼓法~~	~~Seoul area~~	1978-02-02, 1991-11-01 removed	
60		Jangdojang; Ornamental Knife Making 장도장 粧刀匠	South Jeolla area	1978-02-23	
61		Eunyul talchum Mask Dance Drama of Eunyul 은율탈춤 殷栗탈춤	Incheon area	1978-02-23	
62		Jwasuyeong eobang nori Fishing Village Festival of the Left Naval Headquarters 좌수영어방놀이 左水營漁坊놀이	Busan area	1978-05-09	
~~63~~		~~Buk maeugi~~ ~~북메우기~~	~~기타 전국~~	1980-09-01, 1995-03-16 removed	
64		Duseokjang; Metal Craft 두석장 豆錫匠	N/A	1980-11-17	
65		Baekdong yeonjukjang Nickel-Copper Pipe Making 백동연죽장 白銅煙竹匠	North Jeolla area	1980-11-17	
66		Manggeonjang; Horsehair Headband Making 망건장 網巾匠	Jeju area	1980-11-17	
67		Tanggeonjang; Horsehair Hat Making 탕건장 宕巾匠	Jeju area	1980-11-17	
68		Miryang baekjung nori Baekjung Festival of Miryang 밀양백중놀이 密陽百中놀이	South Gyeongsang area	1980-11-17	
69		Hahoe byeolsingut talnori Mask Dance Drama of Hahoe 하회별신굿탈놀이 河回別神굿탈놀이	North Gyeongsang area	1980-11-17	
70		Yangju sonorigut Shamanic Ox Performance of Yangju 양주소놀이굿 楊州소놀이굿	Gyeonggi area	1980-11-17	
71		Jeju chilmeoridang yeongdeunggut Shamanic Performance in the Chilmeoridang Shrine of Jeju 제주칠머리당영등굿 濟州칠머리당영등굿	Jeju area	1980-11-17	
72		Jindo ssitgimgut Purification Ritual of Jindo 진도씻김굿 珍島씻김굿	South Jeolla area	1980-11-17	
73		Gasan ogwangdae Mask Dance Drama of Gasan 가산오광대 駕山五廣大	South Gyeongsang area	1980-11-17	
74		Daemokjang; Traditional Wooden Architecture 대목장 大木匠	N/A	1982-06-01	
75		Gijisi juldarigi Gijisi Tug-of-war 기지시줄다리기 機池市줄다리기	South Chungcheong area	1982-06-01	
76		Taekkyon; Traditional Korean Martial Art 택견	North Chungcheong area	1983-06-01	
77		Yugijang; Brassware Making 유기장 鍮器匠	Gyeonggi area	1983-06-01	
78		Ipsajang; Silver or Gold Inlaying 입사장 入絲匠	Seoul area	1983-06-01	
79		Baltal; Foot Mask Theater 발탈	N/A	1983-06-01	
80		Jasujang; Embroidery 자수장 刺繡匠	N/A	1984-10-15	
81		Jindo dasiraegi Dasiraegi Play of Jindo 진도다시래기 珍島다시래기	South Jeolla area	1985-02-01	
82-1		Donghaean byeolsingut Village Ritual of the East Coast 동해안별신굿 東海岸別神굿	Busan area	1985-02-01	
82-2		Seohaean baeyeonsingut and daedonggut Fishing Ritual of the West Coast 서해안배연신굿및대동굿 西海岸배연신굿및大同굿	Incheon area	1985-02-01	
82-3		Wido ttibaennori Ttibae Boat Festival of Wido Island 위도띠뱃놀이 蝟島띠뱃놀이	North Jeolla area	1985-02-01	
82-4		Namhaean byeolsingut Village Ritual of the South Coast 남해안별신굿 南海岸別神굿	South Gyeongsang area	1987-07-01	
83-1		Gurye hyangje julpungnyu String Ensemble of Gurye 구례향제줄풍류 求禮鄕制줄風流	South Jeolla area	1985-09-01	
83-2		Iri hyangje julpungnyu String Ensemble of Iri 이리향제줄풍류 裡理鄕制줄風流	North Jeolla area	1985-09-01	
84-1		Goseong nongyo Farmers' Song of Goseong 고성농요 固城農謠	South Gyeongsang area	1985-12-01	
84-2		Yecheon tongmyeong nongyo Farmers' Song of Tongmyeong, Yecheon 예천통명농요 醴泉通明農謠	North Gyeongsang area	1985-12-01	
85		Seokjeon daeje National Rite to Confucius 석전대제 釋奠大祭	Seoul area	1986-11-01	
86-1		Munbae-ju; Munbaeju Liquor 문배주 문배酒	Seoul area	1986-11-01	
86-2		Myeoncheon dugyeonju Dugyeonju Liquor of Myeoncheon 면천두견주 沔川杜鵑酒	South Chungcheong area	1986-11-01	
86-3		Gyeongju Gyo-dong beopju Beopju Liquor of Gyo-dong, Gyeongju 경주교동법주 慶州校洞法酒	경북 경주시	1986-11-01	
87		Myeongju jjagi Silk Weaving 명주짜기 明紬짜기	North Gyeongsang area	1988-04-01	
88		Badijang; Reed Making 바디장 바디匠	N/A	1988-08-01	
89		Chimseonjang; Needlework 침선장 針線匠	Seoul area	1988-08-01	
90		Hwanghae-do pyeongsan sonoreumgut Shamanic Ox Performance of Pyeongsan, Hwanghae-do 황해도평산소놀음굿 黃海道平山소놀음굿	Incheon area	1988-08-01	
91		Jewajang; Roof Tile Making 제와장 製瓦匠	Busan	1988-08-01	
92		Taepyeongmu; Dance of Peace 태평무 太平舞	N/A	1988-12-01	
93		Jeontongjang; Quiver Making 전통장 箭筒匠	North Gyeongsang area	1989-06-15	
~~94~~		~~벼루장~~; ~~벼루匠~~	~~Seoul area~~	1989-12-01, 1990-07-20 removed	
95		Jeju minyo Folk Song of Jeju 제주민요 濟州民謠	Jeju area	1989-12-01	
96		Onggijang; Earthenware Making 옹기장 甕器匠	N/A	1990-05-08	
97		Salpurichum; Exorcism Dance 살풀이춤 살풀이춤	N/A	1990-10-10	
98		Gyeonggi-do dodanggut Tutelary Rite of Gyeonggi-do 경기도도당굿 京畿道都堂굿	Gyeonggi area	1990-10-10	
99		Sobanjang; Tray-table Making 소반장 小盤匠	Gyeonggi area	1992-11-10	
100		Okjang; Jade Craft 옥장 玉匠	South Jeolla area	1996-02-01	
101		Geumsok hwaljajang Metal Movable Type Making 금속활자장 金屬活字匠	North Chungcheong area	1996-02-01	
102		Baecheopjang; Mounting 배첩장 褙貼匠	North Chungcheong area	1996-03-11	
103		Wanchojang; Sedge Weaving 완초장 莞草匠	Incheon area	1996-05-01	
104		Seoul saenamgut Shamanic Performance of Seoul 서울새남굿	Seoul area	1996-05-01	
105		Sagijang; Ceramic Making 사기장 沙器匠	North Gyeongsang area	1996-07-01	
106		Gakjajang; Calligraphic Engraving 각자장 刻字匠	Seoul area	1996-11-01	
107		Nubijang; Quilting 누비장 縷緋匠	North Gyeongsang area	1996-12-10	
108		Mokjogakjang; Wood Sculpture 목조각장 木彫刻匠	N/A	1996-12-31	
109		Hwagakjang; Ox Horn Inlaying 화각장 華角匠	Incheon area	1996-12-31	
110		Yundojang; Geomantic Compass (luopan) Making 윤도장 輪圖匠	North Jeolla area	1996-12-31	
111		Sajik daeje National Rite to Gods of Earth and Grain 사직대제 社稷大祭	Seoul area	2000-10-19	
112		Jucheoljang; Casting 주철장 鑄鐵匠	North Chungcheong area	2001-03-12	
113		Chiljang; Lacquerware Making 칠장 漆匠	Seoul area	2001-03-12	
114		Yeomjang; Bamboo Blind Making 염장 簾匠	South Gyeongsang area	2001-06-27	
115		Yeomsaekjang; Natural Dyeing 염색장 染色匠	South Jeolla area	2001-09-06	
116		Hwahyejang; Shoe Making 화혜장 靴鞋匠	190-37 Macheon-dong, Seoul	2004-02-20	
117		Hanjijang; Korean Paper Making 한지장 韓紙匠	N/A	2005-09-23	
118		Bulhwajang; Buddhist Painting 불화장 佛畵匠	Gyeonggi area	2006-01-10	
119		Geumbakjang; Gold Leaf Imprinting 금박장 金箔匠	Gyeonggi area	2006-11-16	
120		Seokjang; Stone Masonry 석장 石匠	Gyeonggi area	2007-09-17	
121		Beonwajang; Tile Roofing 번와장 翻瓦匠	Seoul area	2008-10-21	
122		Yeondeunghoe; Buddhist Lantern Festival 연등회 燃燈會	Jongno District, Seoul	2012-04-06	
123		Beopseongpo danoje Dano Festival of Beopseongpo 법성포단오제 法聖浦端午祭	South Jeolla area	2012-07-23	
124		Gungjung chaehwa Royal Silk Flower Making 궁중채화 宮中綵花	Yangsan area	2013-01-14	
125		Samhwasa suryukjae Water and Land Ceremony of Samhwasa Temple 삼화사 수륙재 三和寺水陸齋	Gangwon area	2013-12-31	
126		Jingwansa suryukjae Water and Land Ceremony of Jingwansa Temple 진관사 수륙재 津寬寺水陸齋	Seoul	2013-12-31	
127		Araennyeok suryukjae Water and Land Ceremony of Gyeongsang-do 아랫녘 수륙재 아랫녘 水陸齋	South Gyeongsang area	2014-03-18	
128		Seonjajang; Fan Making 선자장 扇子匠	Jeonju area	2015-07-08	
129		Arirang 아리랑		2015-09-22	
130		Jeda; Traditional Tea Making 제다 製茶		2016-07-14	
131		Ssireum; Traditional Korean Wrestling 씨름		2017-01-04	
132		Haenyeo; Women Divers 해녀 海女	N/A	2017-05-01	
133		Kimchi damgeugi Kimchi Making 김치 담그기	N/A	2017-11-15	
134		Jeyeom; Traditional Salt Making 제염 製鹽	N/A	2018-04-30	
135		Ondol; Underfloor Heating 온돌문화 溫突文化	N/A	2018-04-30	
136		Nakhwajang; Pyrography 낙화장 烙畵匠	Boeun County	2018-12-27	
137		Jang damgeugi Korean Sauce and Paste Making 장 담그기 醬 담그기		2018-12-27	
138-1		Eosal; Fishing Weir 전통어로방식-어살		2019-04-03	
139		Bulbokjang jakbeop Ritual Process of Placing Objects Inside Buddhist Statues 불복장작법 佛腹藏作法	Seoul	2019-04-30	
140		삼베짜기		2019-12-31	
141		사경장 寫經匠		2020-07-20	
142		활쏘기		2020-07-30	
143		인삼 재배와 약용문화		2020-12-01	
144		막걸리 빚기		2021-06-15	
145		떡 만들기		2021-11-01	
-		갯벌어로		2021-12-20	
-		제주큰굿	Jeju area	2021-12-22	
