= Eunsan byeolsinje =

Traditional Korean ceremony

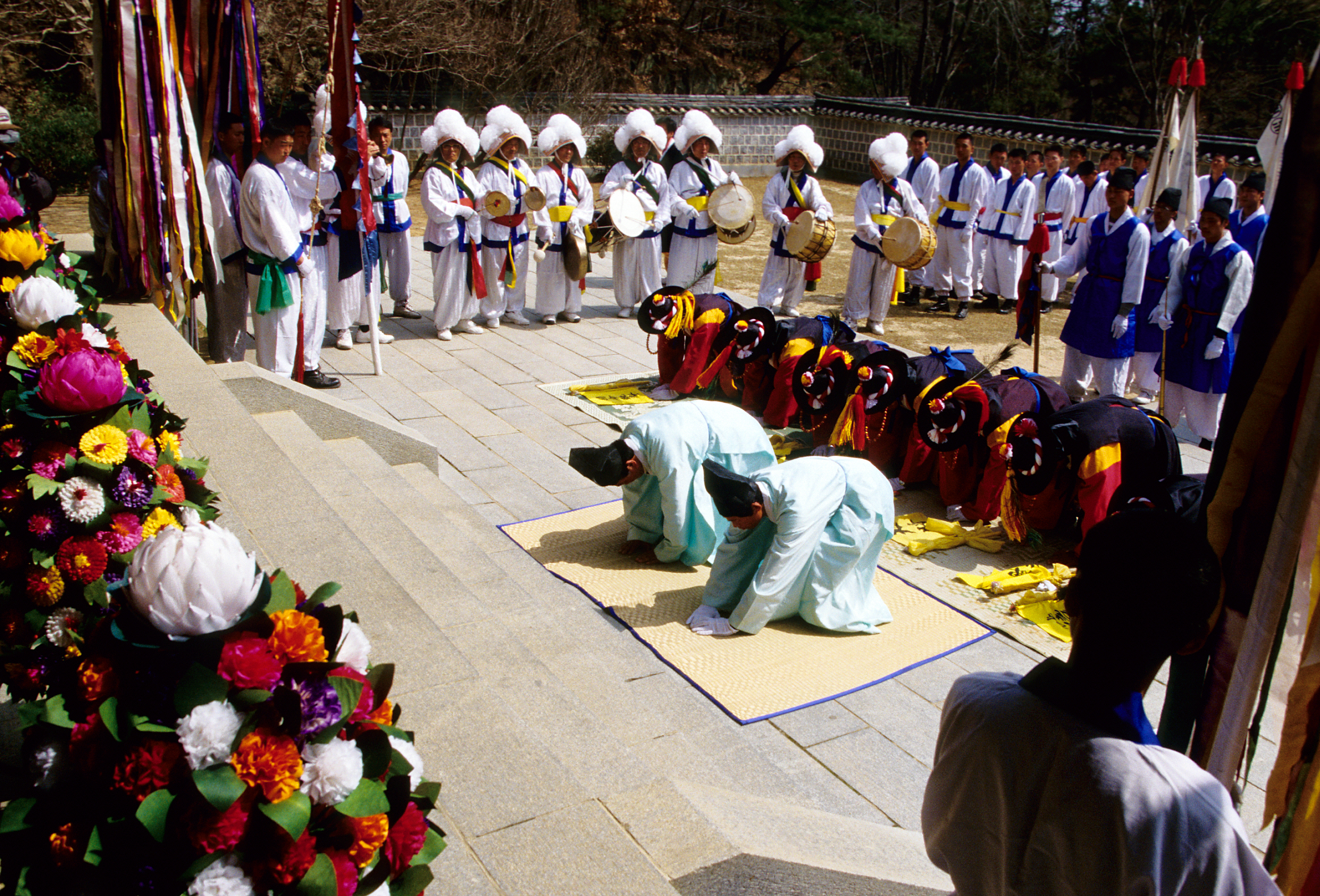
- Eunsan byeolsinje (2002)

Korean name
- Hangul: 은산별신제
- Hanja: 恩山別神祭
- Revised Romanization: Eunsan byeolsinje
- McCune–Reischauer: Ŭnsan pyŏlsinje

Eunsan byeolsinje (Korean: 은산별신제) is Korea's traditional shamanism ceremony which is selected as the ninth Important Intangible Cultural Property of Korea in 1966 after Ganggang sullae. It is performed mainly in Eunsan-ri, Eunsan-myeon, Buyeo-gun, Chungcheongnam-do, South Korea.

== History ==
North of Eunsan-ri is a mountain called Dangsan (당산; 堂山), and a shrine was built on the southern slope, dedicated to the mountain god, the monk Dochim who led an army to revive Baekje, and Gwisil Boksin, a general who, together with his subordinates, participated in the uprising to revive Baekje. The general and his soldiers were killed and their bones were scattered around the area, thus becoming vengeful spirits that bought about calamities.

According to a local legend, there was once a deadly plague in the area, which had the villagers worried. One spring day, an old man was napping when he dreamt of the general who, riding on a white horse, requested the bones of him and his soldiers to be recollected. The old man mobilized the villagers, and they fulfilled the general's request by collecting the bones before burying them. The plague ended, and peace was restored.

Therefore, the villagers built a shrine, which is called Eunsan Byeolsindang (은산별신당; 恩山別神堂), and held a ritual ceremony for these spirits every three years on the first month, in hopes that the area will be free of calamities. The ceremony eventually evolved into today's Byeolsinje.

== Procedures ==
At the beginning of the new year, shamans will hold a ceremony for the mountain god, called Sansinje (산신제; 山神祭); Byeolsinje is traditionally held every three years, and it is much bigger than Sansinje. At the end of the previous year, a meeting will be held by the village elders, confirming the roles of the ceremony, usually involving around 100 people. This includes one captain, one lieutenant, one commander, two senior lieutenants, two junior lieutenants, one interpreter, one flower master, one meat-preparation master, three separate servants, and one ceremonial officer, as well as a shaman, a flower maker, a craftsman, a farmer's musician, a flag bearer, and a material carrier. Of these, the captain is the most honorable position, offered to a person of virtue and wealth.

Individuals involved in performing the ceremony must be clean, that is, they must have no wrongdoings, been in mourning, seen a corpse, suffered childbirth or killed anyone, otherwise it will incur the wrath of the spirits, and calamities will descend onto the village.

In the past, the ceremony lasts for about two weeks, but in modern times it was shortened to six days or less. On the first day, a gold rope is tied on the river Eunsancheon (은산천; 恩山川) which will not be taken off until the ceremony is over. Winemaking is held on the same day. On the second day, dozens of people climb the mountain to chop off jindae (진대; 陣木) trees, a type of tree that is used to mark a military camp in the past. At the same time, villagers would visit the houses of the people involved in the ceremony, where a ritual to purge evil spirits are held.

On the third day, villagers would receive flowers, which on the fourth day would be offered to the spirits along with other offerings such as a slain pig, which is boiled and offered in the center of the altar. The fifth day is the day of Danggut (당굿; 堂-), when rituals were held to pray for the safety of Byeolsinje participants, and those who attended the ritual at the shrine in person can receive those flowers, said to expel misfortune and attract good luck for that person until the next Byeolsinje.

During Danggut, a bell is hung at the end of a flag, and if it rings while the shaman sings and dance, it means that the spirit responded; if it doesn't, or that the shaman does not sing and dance, then it is believed that there is an 'unclean' person within the roles of the ceremony, and the ice of Eunsancheon have to be broken so that a cleansing could be carried out.

On the sixth day, Korean totem poles called jangseung are erected on the roads north, south, east and west of the village, accompanied by a ritual. Byeolsinje ends with Doksanje (독산제; 獨山祭), a ritual thanking the mountain god that watched over the ceremony and guaranteed its smooth execution.

In modern times, the ceremony is held every year from late March to early April; in even years it is a grand festival and in odd years it is a small festival. Locations of the ceremony include Byeolsindang and the town, where a parade is held during the erection of jangseungs. The Eunsan Byeolsinje Preservation Society (은산별신제보존회; 恩山別神祭保存會), formed in 1986, is in charge of the ceremony.

== Transmission ==
Like many other local festivals in Korea, Eunsan byeolsinje also stopped during the era under the colonial administration of imperial Japan and restarted after Korean independence. Currently, Cha Jin-yong, Park Chang-gu, and Hwang Nam-hee were additionally designated as holders of Eunsan byeolsinje and they are preserving and transmitting the play.
