= Baltal =

Baltal may refer to:

- Baltal (art form), a type of Korean puppet theatre
- Baltal, Jammu and Kashmir
