= Goseong ogwangdae =

Korean mask dance drama

- Goseong Ogwangdae
- Hangul: 고성오광대
- Hanja: 固城五廣大
- Revised Romanization: Goseong Ogwangdae
- McCune–Reischauer: Kosŏng ogwangdae

Goseong Ogwangdae (Korean: 고성오광대; Hanja: 固城五廣大) is a Korean traditional masked dance drama and was listed as the 7th Important Intangible Cultural Property on 24 December 1964, following Tongyeong Ogwangdae. The tradition is handed down and performed in Goseong, Gyeongsangnam-do, South Korea.

== History ==
Its origin and the transmission path are unknown but according to the performance holder, person in Masan province succeeded it to others in early 1900s. Its original content is changed gradually, but Goseong Ogwangdae has the most youngnam province style because of its characteristic of lines, masks, costume, dance kept its origin the most. It was forbiddened during the Japanese colonial era, but it came back after the independence. the performance shows the life of ordinary people and satirizing the landed gentry and ridiculing the problem of wives. It was played in the 15th day of the New Year according to the lunar calendar in the past, but today the performance usually played in Spring and autumn. Unlike the other five story traditional mask playing, Goseong Ogwangdae has no ceremony exorcising evil spirits before and after the performance instead it is more entertainment.

== Performers of the drama ==
At present the drama has one National Human Treasure, or 보유자, Yi Yunseok. Yi is a very well known natural dancer, and he has particularly in the last twenty or thirty years often been a featured solo performer at highly promoted and exceptional performances of the top dancers in various traditional genres in Korea. He is known as a "dancing farmer" and an entire book was written about him and his life (he is, indeed, a farmer).

The entire list of present performers can be seen on the website of the Goseong Ogwangdae Preservation Association.

Goseong Ogwangdae performers include many full time professionals in the traditional arts, including a group of young men moved to Seoul and formed the performing troupe The Gwangdae. Membership has changed over the years, but Goseong Ogwangdae core performers including An Daecheon, Choe Yeongho, Heo Changyeol, and Seon Yeong-uk are still performing with both groups *국악콘서트 판- 도는 놈 뛰는 놈 나는 놈 - 연희집단 The 광대 on YouTube by 국악방송, (26 September 2021). In addition, Heo Changyeol is also one of the two leaders of Cheonha Jeiltal a group that specifically performers mask dance drama, often showing performative differences of mask dance dramas in different parts of the country *탈춤 퍼레이드 PARADE MASTER on YouTube by 천하제일탈공작소, (31 December 2021). The activities of The Gwangdae and Cheonha Jeiltal spread the influence of Goseong Ogwangdae as a key performance of the Korean traditional arts.
