= Bukcheong sajanoreum =

Korean traditional lion mask dance

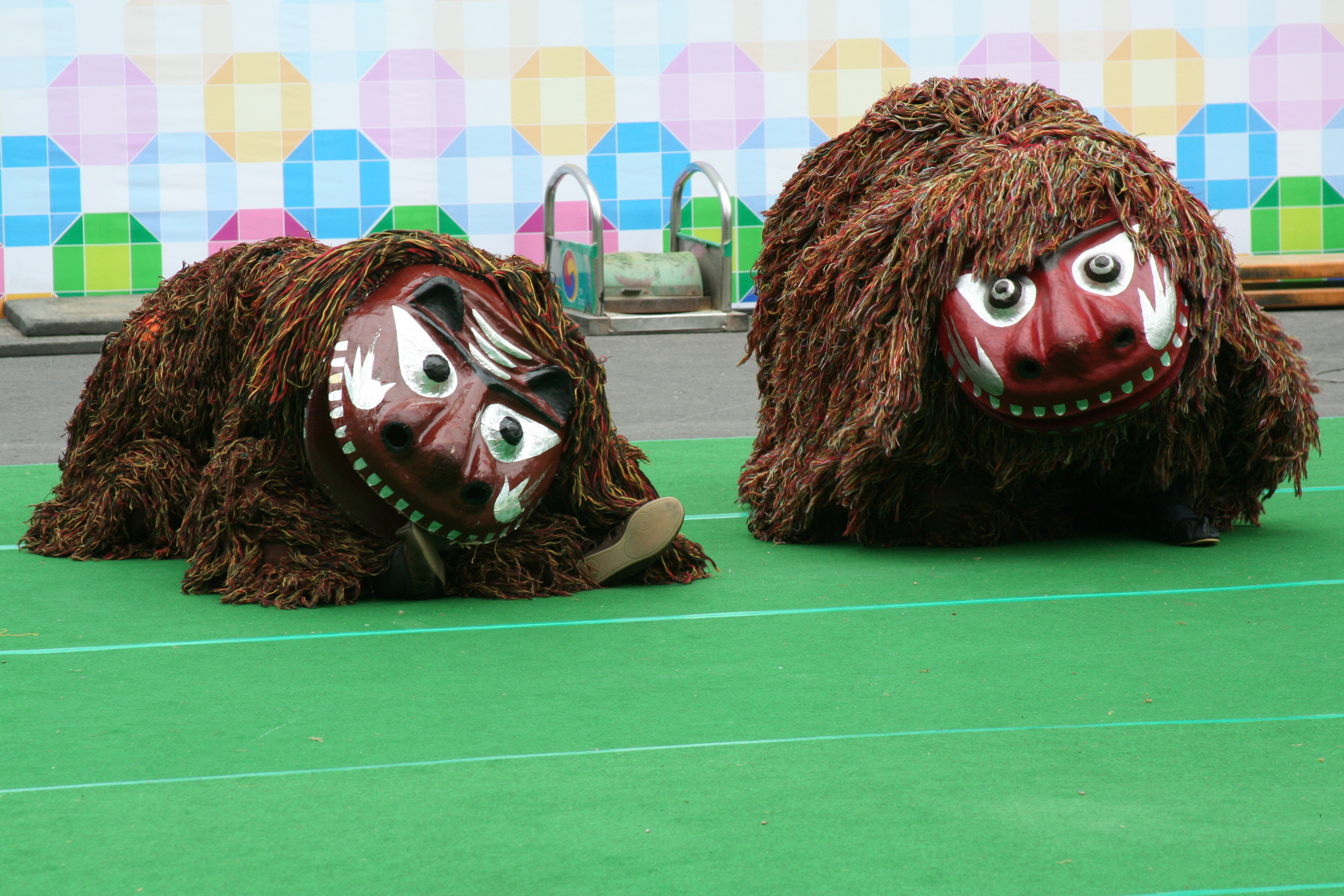

Korean name
- Hangul: 북청사자놀음
- Hanja: 北靑獅子놀음
- RR: Bukcheong sajanoreum
- MR: Pukch'ŏng sajanorŭm

Bukcheong sajanoreum (Korean: 북청사자놀음) is a traditional play in Korea which was selected as the 15th Important Intangible Cultural Properties of Korea, next to Hansan mosijjagi. It was performed in Pukchong, South Hamgyong Province in Korea every the 15th day of the New Year according to the lunar calendar, and involves dancing with a lion mask. Its origins are rooted in a folk belief that lions have the power to turn away the evil ghosts and bring peace.

== History ==
It was played in every region in Bukcheong province, but was particularly famous in three towns: Bukcheong-eup, Gaheomyun, Gutangcheon. In this province, people in small towns decorated their own lion masks and would then compete with other lion masks in the region. Competitions started in 1930, though poor and/or small teams have since disappeared. The winning team was awarded crops as a prize to be used as scholarships, relief for the poor, and for the elderly.

== Procedures ==
Before the main event, the young men from small towns would compete with a torch in what was called torch fighting. The lion dance starts on the 14th night of the lunar calendar and continues until the next day at dawn. The dancers would eventually visit a local wealthy family's house. If the lion mask team is invited in, they go to the garden to continue dancing, then into the main room for dancing and eating, and then to the kitchen, and back to the inner garden. The room route would then repeat over and over. Sometimes small children would grab onto them because it was believed that children would live longer lives if they take hold or get its hair.

== Transmission ==
In August 1960, people who defected to South Korea from Bukchung province organized a transmission committee. At that time, Yun Youn-chun, Kim Su-seok, Byun Young-ho, Dong Young-suk, Yeo Je-sung, Jeon Jung-sik and others were designated as holders.
