= Baecheop =

Korean calligraphy preservation

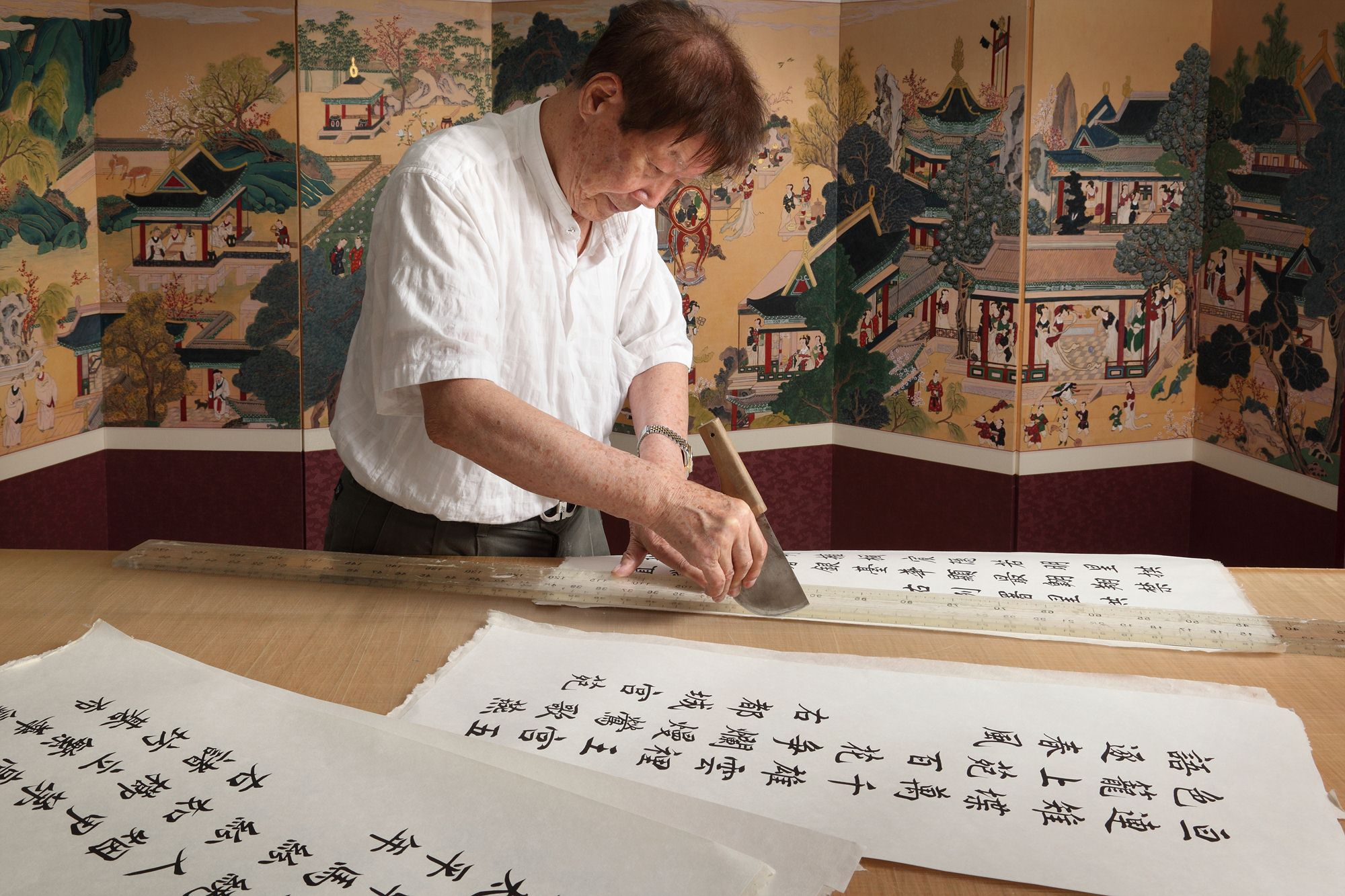
A man practicing baecheop (2009)

Baecheop (Korean: 배첩) is the Korean art of preserving scrolls of brushed calligraphy or paintings by applying a silk or paper mounting. Craftsmen who specialise in this process are known as baecheopjang (Korean: 배첩장), one of whom, Kim Pyo-young, is an Important Intangible Cultural Property of Korea.

The techniques used originated in China, but is recorded in Korea as early as the Goguryeo period. Baecheop was widely used in the Joseon period for processing the artworks held in royal collections.

The glue used is a paste of flour and water which is fermented over as long as a decade. The hanji used must be carefully selected, as some papers contain chemicals which can, over time, cause damage to the original artwork. Mountings can take the form of scrolls, folding screens, processed documents, covered bindings or framed art.
