= Yeongsan soemeoridaegi =

Traditional Korean game

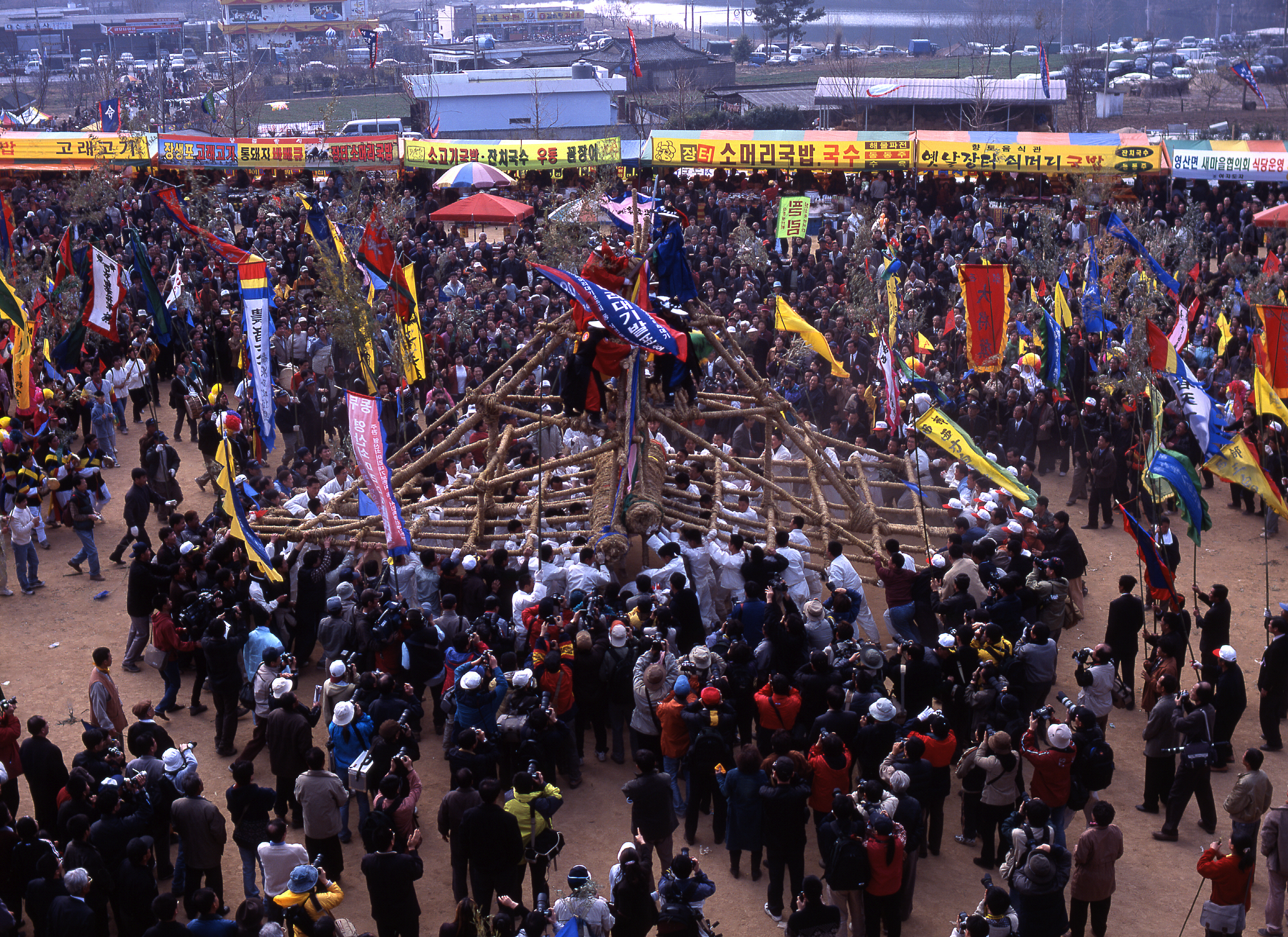
- A performance (2003)

Korean name
- Hangul: 영산 쇠머리대기
- Hanja: 靈山쇠머리대기
- RR: Yeongsan soemeoridaegi
- MR: Yŏngsan soemŏridaegi

Yeongsan soemeoridaegi (Korean: 영산 쇠머리대기; lit. Wooden bull fighting of Yeongsan) is a traditional game in Korea which is selected as the 25th Important Intangible Cultural Property next to Andong's Chajeon Nori. It is originally played in Yeongsan-myeon, Changnyeong-gun, South Gyeongsang Province, Korea. It is also called mogujeon (목우전; lit. wood cow fighting) in the province.

== History ==
It started as a prayer for farming prosperity for the next year and there was a belief that the winning town would have a fruitful year. It originated from actual cow fighting which was later replaced by wooden cows. Although there is no record of its origin, Youngsan is the place where the performance has flourished among in Youngnam Province according to related researches. It is influenced by Andong Chajeon Nori, which is the traditional game in Andong Province and its equipment for playing and the appearance of a wood cow is similar to it. Also the rule of play is the same: the team that pushes from upper side is the winner.

== Procedures ==
Like any other traditional game in Korea, Yeongsan soemeoridaegi is also played in the 15th day of the New Year according to the lunar calendar. The full moon stands for prosperity and people believed that the winning team would have a rich year. When the game players met in a barley field, even the owner of the field was pleased because it was thought to help the barley to grow well.

As the date approaches, people start to make a wood cow with three logs to be tied together and lifted up so that people could climb. A cow mask was then put on the upper side. Teams are divided into east and west teams; each team with a general, major-general, and lieutenant general to lead their team. Then dozens of people carried the wood cow's head on their shoulders. On top of wood cow, generals directed the event and danced with swords.

== Transmission ==
Yeongsan soemeoridaegi disappeared in the era under the colonial administration of imperial Japan and it was revealed by the 3.1 event in 1968 after 30 years of disappearance. Kim hyung-gwun for playing the game.
