= Dongnae yaryu =

Korean traditional masked drama play

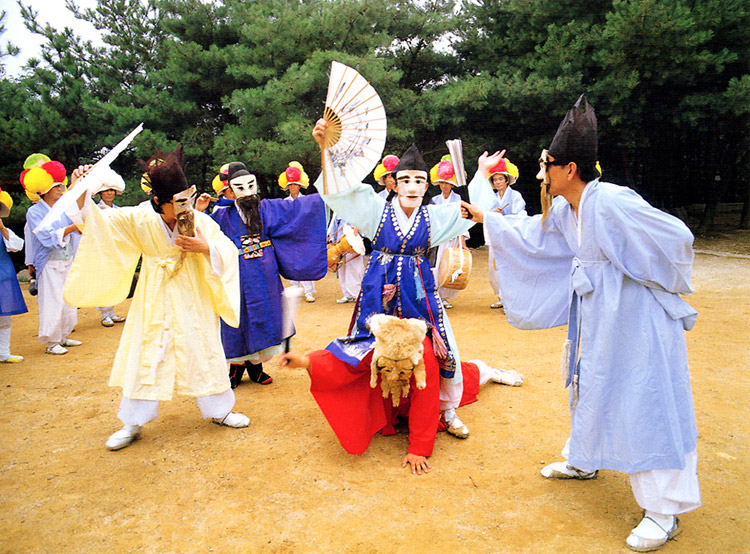

Korean name
- Hangul: 동래야류
- Hanja: 東萊野遊
- Revised Romanization: Dongnae yaryu
- McCune–Reischauer: Tongnae yaryu

Dongnae yaryu (Korean: 동래야류) is a traditional masked drama play in Korea. It has been performed for over 120 years in Oncheon-dong, Dongnae-gu. It has been named by the government of Korea - Suyeong Yaryu, as one of the Important Intangible Cultural Properties of Korea.

Yaryu refers to a drama performed outdoors in a field, especially in Gyeongsangnam-do province . Its main contents are satire and criticism towards commoners and noblemen. The Dongnae yaryu tradition was long maintained by Ohgwangdae, a professional theatre troupe.

== Tradition ==
The Dongnae yaryu is traditionally performed on the night of the 15th day of the New Year according to the Lunar calendar. The dance is a prayer for the prosperity of farming and for peace, although it the present day, the dance is performed more for the fun than for the spiritual aspects.

The Dongnae yaryu celebration was suspended in 1937; it was then reorganized in 1950.

== Procedures ==
At the beginning of the new year, a music group is organised by people in town to visit houses and collect money from the rich. When the festival day comes, people gather together at bridge (busan bridge, buma bridge) for a costume parade to the place where the yaryu is performed.

The parade is led by the character "Nongjang", followed by other characters and bands. When the parade arrives at the performance site, people in town color their face with Chinese ink or put on masks and dance together. The masks are typically made from gourds or leather, covered with traditional Korean paper handmade from mulberry trees and colored with paint.
