= Hwahyejang =

Korean footwear craftsmen

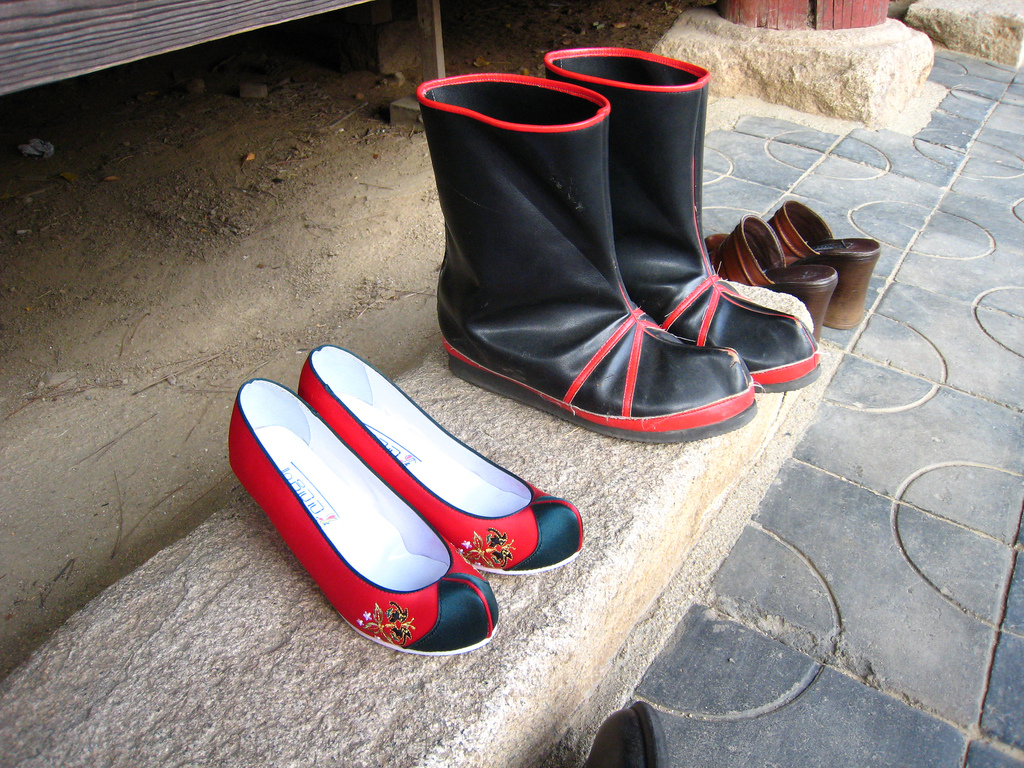
Hye (foreground) and hwa (background)

Hwahyejang (Korean: 화혜장) are craftsmen who construct traditional Korean footwear. The shoes are classified into hwa (shoes that go over the ankle) and hye (shoes that do not cover the ankle), hence the compound word "hwahyejang". Historically, the two distinct types of shoe were made by separate specialist craftsmen, the hyejang and the hwajang.

== Hwang Hae-bong ==
The only surviving traditional hwahyejang in Korea today is Hwang Hae-bong, who operates a small workshop in Seoul. His family have been making shoes for five generations. Hwang learned the trade from his grandfather and is training his second son Hwang Deok-jin to continue in the profession. In 2004, at the age of sixty, Hwang was recognised by Korea's Cultural Heritage Association as an intangible cultural asset, following in the footsteps of his grandfather Hwang Han-gap, who was made a cultural asset in 1971.

== History ==
The basic form of the Korean shoe was developed during the Three Kingdoms era, although earlier forms date back to prehistoric times. During the early Joseon period as many as 30 professional shoemakers were employed at court. The shoemaking caste, however, was considered cheonmin, the lowest possible caste. At this time, shoes were an important indicator of a person's profession or social status, with designs, colours and styles varying depending on social caste or occupation. However, after the Gabo Reform of 1894, traditional leather shoes became less popular, and in the twentieth century were largely superseded by rubber gomusin.

Since the release of Kim Yong-ik's short story Wedding Shoes and the film Ggotsin ("flower shoes") the term ggotsin (or Kkotsin) has become a popular alternative name for classical Korean shoes. Hwahye are still worn for special occasions such as royal weddings, and for days of national mourning. In 2004 the art of shoemaking was recognised as an Important Intangible Cultural Property of Korea.

== Construction ==
It can take as much as a week to craft a single pair of shoes. The shoes are typically made from leather obtained from cows, pigs or sheep, although historically horsehide and deerskin were also used. Whereas Western shoes are shaped differently for left and right feet, Korean shoes are identical for both feet; the softness of the leather gradually conforms to the shape of the owner's foot. Some types have ribbons or laces that are knotted around the ankle to keep the shoe in place. Many are decorated with floral designs, and are sometimes covered with an ornamental silk upper.

The process of creating a traditional shoe involves up to 72 individual processes, the most important of which is the stitching. This is performed using a needle made from a boar bristle, rather than a manufactured steel needle, due to the need for flexibility.

== Styles ==
The following table shows the main types of traditional Korean shoe made by the hwahyejang:

Shoe types
Name	Features	Use
Jeokseok	Red, secured by ankle ribbons	Worn by the king for official and ritual occasions
Taesahye	Silk or sheepskin upper, leather sole. High, wide toe with white lines.	Everyday shoe for men
Balmakhye	Black or grey	Used by the elderly or infirm
Woekohye	Dyed black or grey silk, patterned toe	General use
Yuhye	Waterproofed using perilla oil, sole affixed with clout nails	Wet weather shoe
Baekhye	White	Mourning shoe worn after a king's death by the general populace
Onhye	Quilted lining	Winter footwear
Jaehye	Short ribbons attached which are tied for a secure fit	Ceremonial and ritual use
Hwaja	Black and unadorned, with a leather or wooden sole and a woollen upper	Worn by court officials on palace business
Baekmokhwa	Undecorated	Mourning shoe worn after a king's death by court officials
Cheongseok	Blue with ankle ribbons	Worn by the queen
Danghye	Patterned silk	Worn by upper-class women
Unhye	Silk with a cloud pattern	Worn by upper-class women
Soohye	Silk embroidered with flowers	Also called ggotsin
Gihye	Black silk or leather	Worn by kisaeng
