= Chaesang =

Traditional Korean woven baskets

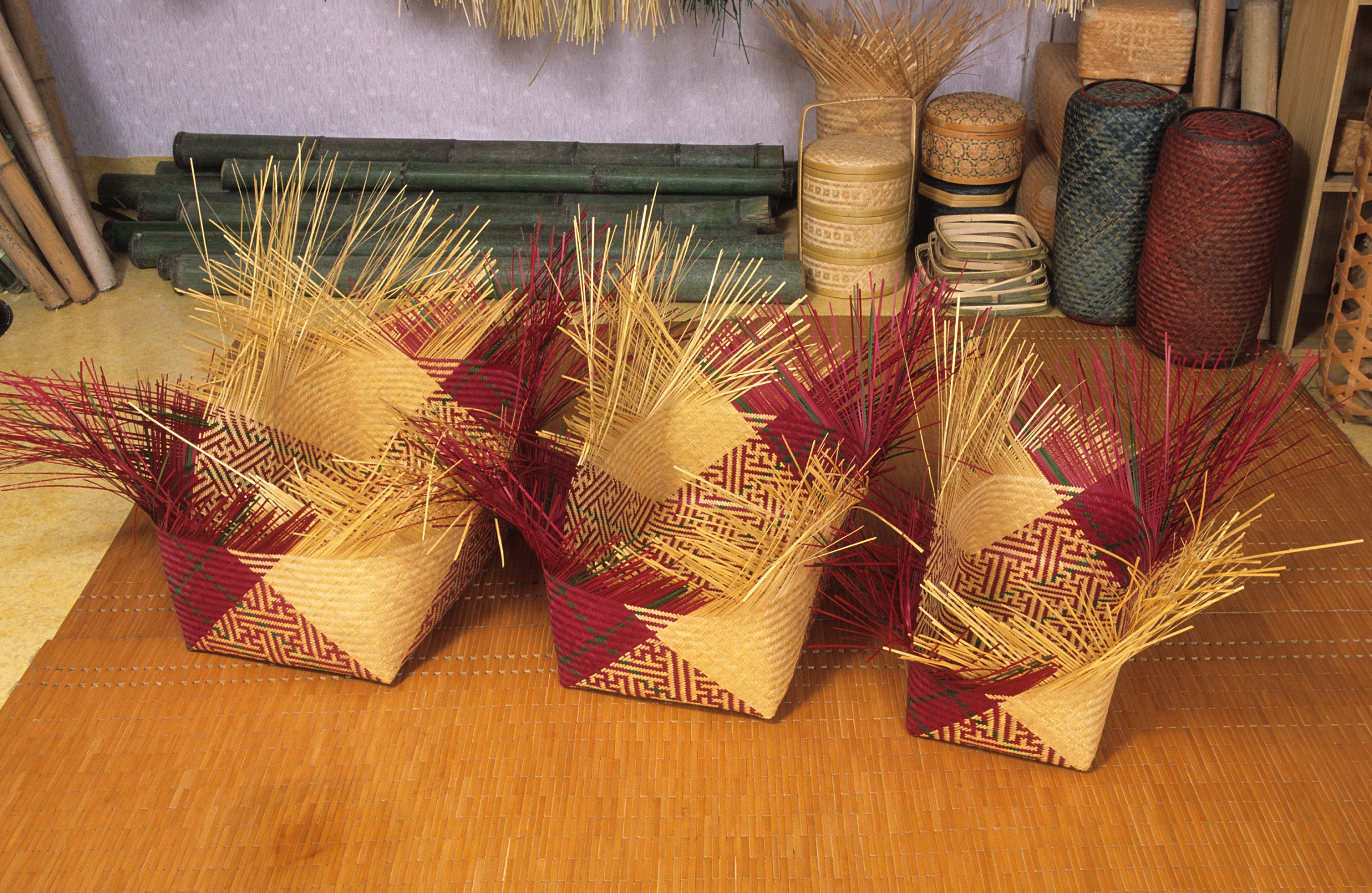
Baskets in Damyang (2003)

Chaesang (Korean: 채상; Hanja: 彩箱) are woven boxes or baskets constructed from strips of bamboo. The art of constructing such baskets (chaesang-jang) is represented by the sole surviving master craftsman, Seo Han-gyu, who, along with the art itself, is one of the Important Intangible Cultural Properties of Korea.

Historically, chaesang were used by women of the Korean aristocracy to store clothing or jewels. They were constructed by married couples, and were often used to store the items needed for a daughter's dowry.

== Construction ==
First, the craftsman peels long strips from a bamboo plant, using his teeth. The strips are cut to length, arranged in a thin layer, soaked in water, and dyed using natural pigments. The strips are then woven together in various designs, each with a symbolic meaning, and the ends are trimmed. Each box is covered with silk or satin, and finally, a double layer of paper is used to line the base. Chaesang are usually created in nested groups of three, although five or even seven nested boxes are not unheard of. It can take two weeks, or even as long as a month to produce a set.
