= Tongyeong ogwangdae =

Traditional Korean mask performance

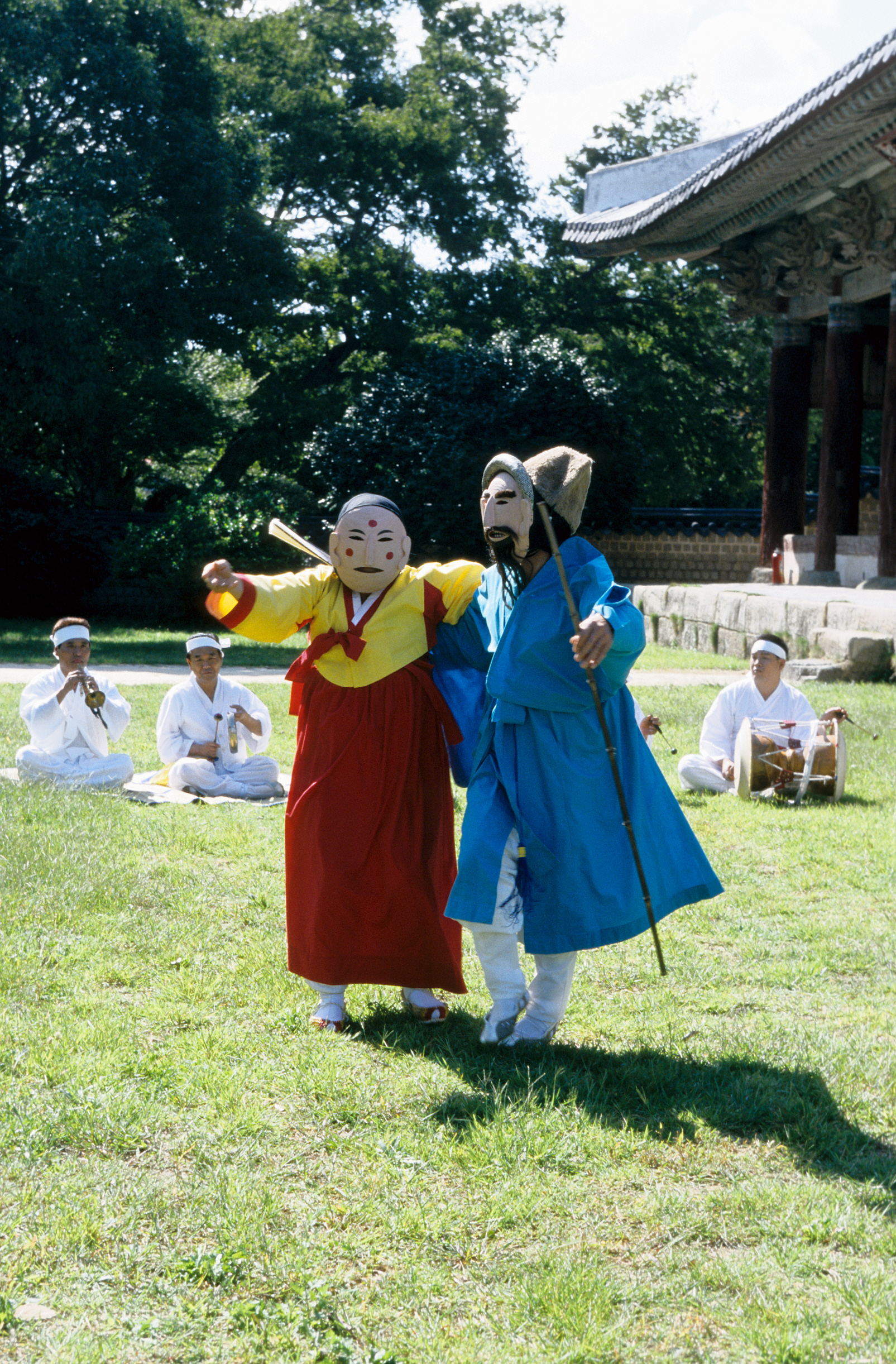

Korean name
- Hangul: 통영오광대놀이
- Hanja: 統營五廣大놀이
- Revised Romanization: Tongyeong ogwangdae nori
- McCune–Reischauer: T'ongyŏng ogwangdae nori

Tongyeong ogwangdae (Korean: 통영오광대놀이) is Korea's traditional mask performance which was selected as the sixth Important Intangible Cultural Property of Korea next to Pansori. It is a yeoongna-style mask performance, distributed mainly in Gyeongsangnam-do province in Korea. The meaning of its Korean name, ogwandae, is 'five clowns' because the play is organized with five different masked players and has five stories.

== History ==
According to the Korean Culture and Information Service, Tongyeong ogwandae was started 90 years ago by Uiheunggye. Later, old people called Nansagye maintained it and Jang jae-bong who was in the group of Chunheunggye succeeded and restored it when he was 29 years old. With its origin in the 16th century in Yongyouung, the navy force was established; on the last day of the year, people gathered for a ceremony with mask performances. 30 musicians who were drafted in the navy from small islands practiced starting the 28th of the twelfth month of the lunar year. They marched in procession in the office district and then private houses from New Year's Eve until the 15th of January. The performance was a kind of ceremony to exorcise evil spirits. The name of the mask Junggwandae leads the procession chanting Buddhist prayers to exorcise ghosts. The performance portrays the lives of ordinary people, satirizes the landed gentry, and ridicules the problem of wives. The most serious satire is the performance of Malttugi mocking noblemen. Currently Tongyeong ogwangdae is the only traditional Korean dance which has the sajachum.

== Procedures ==
The directing of Tongyeong ogwangdae is similar to other five-story mask dances in Korea but the percussion accompaniment has the characteristic style of the province. Ogwandae's dancing is called dutbegi and Malttuki's dancing is an active sword dance but becomes more calm. The first story is about Mundung-tal. Mundung comes out with instruments and dances with lamentation. He says that his incurable illness is due to his ancestors. The second story is about Pungja-tal. Malttuki comes out and ridicules seven noblemen and argues that he is the only noble. The third story is about Youngno-tal, who is a monster. He eats everything and says he has eaten 99 noblemen and will become a dragon if he eats one more nobleman. The nobleman claims that he is not a noble but Youngno finds him. The fourth story is about Nongchang-tal. Two monks dance for jaejagaksi and are thrown out by the grandmother. The last story is about Posu-tal. A marten comes out and is eaten by the lion and it dies by the cather (law of the jungle).

== Transmission ==
Tongyeong ogwangdae became an Important Intangible Cultural Property of Korea in 1964. At that time, the holders were designated Jang jae-bong, Oh Jung-du, Kim jin-su, Gu sam-bong, Go young-su, Mun Chang-seob, Kim sam sung, and Yoo ding-ju.
