= Yeonsan Station =

Yeonsan Station (Korean: 연산) is a railroad stations in South Korea.

- Yeonsan Station (Busan)
- Yeonsan Station (Nonsan)
