= Hansan Mosi =

Weaved fabric

- Type: Fabric
- Material: Ramie fiber
- Production method: Weaving
- Production process: Handicraft
- Place of origin: Hansan-myeon, South Korea

Weaving of Mosi (fine ramie) in the Hansan region
- UNESCO Intangible Cultural Heritage
- Country: South Korea
- Reference: 00453
- Region: Asia and the Pacific

Inscription history
- Inscription: 2011 (6th session)
- List: Representative

Hansan Mosi (Korean: 한산모시), a fine Ramie (Mosi in Korean) weaved fabric made in Hansan area of Seocheon County in South Chungcheong Province, is one of Korean traditional textiles. It is used to produce different types of clothing and due to its light weight, they are mostly worn in hot weather.

Hansan mosi –its weaving and all the processes related to it– is inscribed in UNESCO Intangible Cultural Heritage List since 2011 and enlisted as South Korean Intangible Cultural Property since 1967.
