= Jultagi =

Traditional Korean tightrope-walking

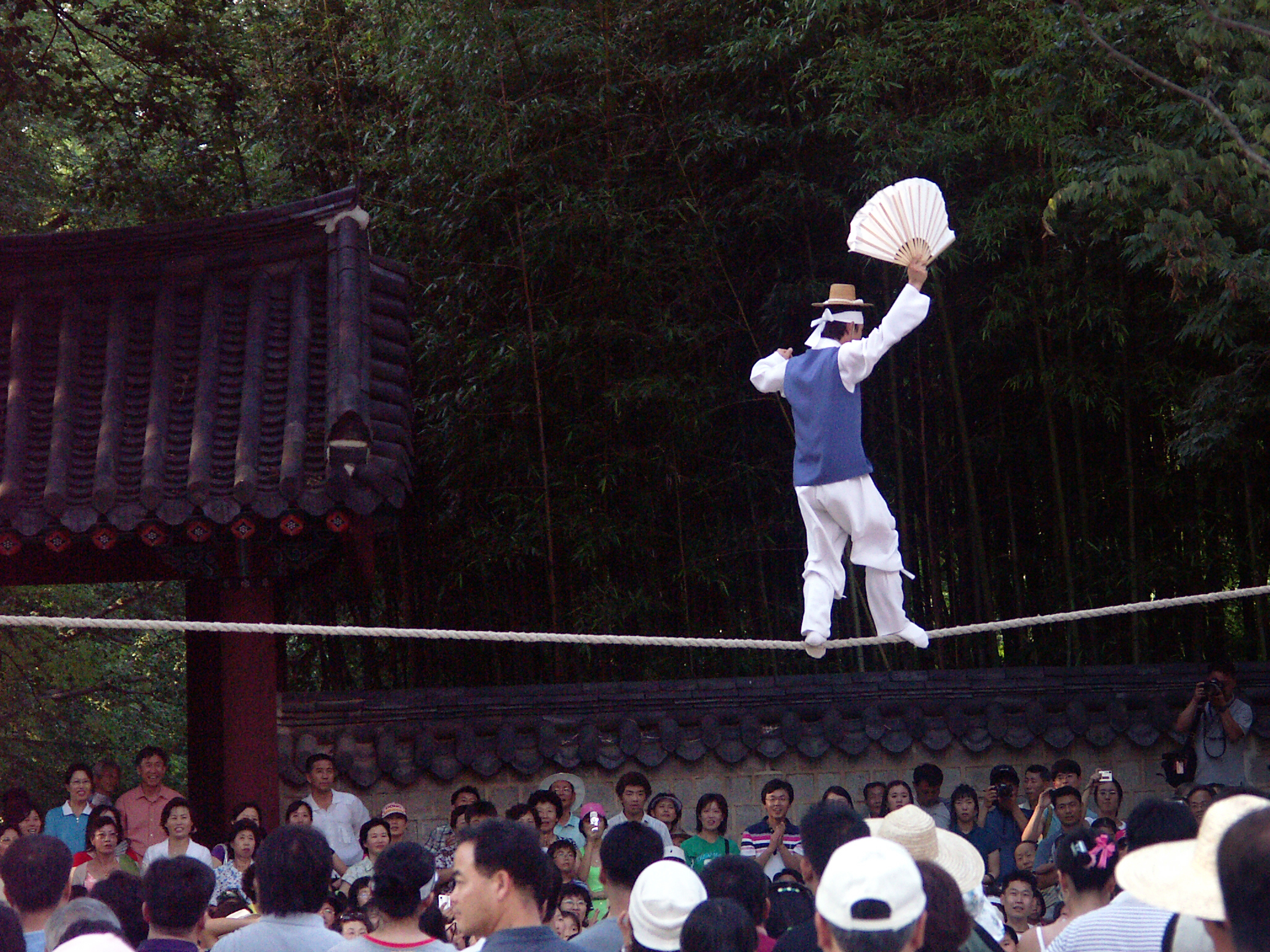
- The performance of "Jultagi" in Jeonju, South Korea.

Korean name
- Hangul: 줄타기; 어름
- RR: jultagi; eoreum
- MR: chult'agi; ŏrŭm

Jultagi (Korean: 줄타기) or eoreum (어름) is traditional Korean performance of tightrope-walking. It is included into South Korea's Important Intangible Cultural Properties number 58.

== Origin ==
There is no evidence when this acrobatic performance originated. Some scholars presumed it appeared during Silla and Goryeo era. It became more famous in Joseon dynasty era and still exists to this day.

It is different from the tightrope-walking styles of other countries, because it is usually accompanied by music plays by telling a story to entertain viewers. Jultagi is held on public holidays in South Korea like Daeboreum, Dano and Chuseok holidays. The Korean folk village in Seoul also presents this play to entertain tourists. It was also performed in events held in the royal palace, banquets of high-ranking government officers or village festivals. The tightrope walking performance is composed of a rope player, a clown and musical instrument players.

An example of these plays can be seen in the movie King and the Clown.

== Technique ==
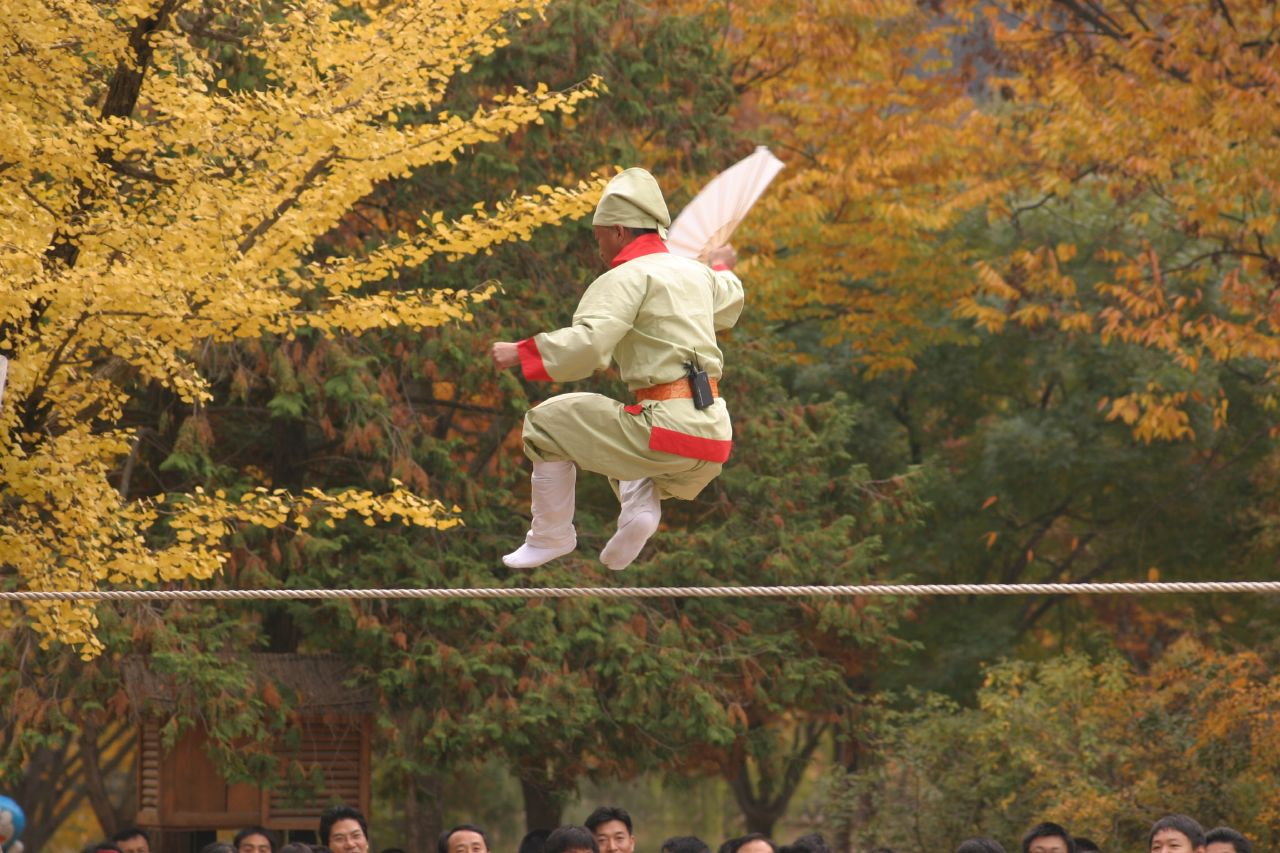
A jultagi performance at Korean Folk Village

There are more than 40 kinds of Jultagi techniques including a walking on a tight rope as the basic motion, a reversed walking on it, leaping with one foot on it, sitting and lying on it, and sometimes pretending to fall down. Another elaborate tightrope walking trick is jumping up after kneeling on the tightrope with one knee and then landing on the rope in a cross-legged sitting position. Some expert tightrope walkers can jump forward while standing on the rope without falling.

== Transmitter ==
Information of Possessors
Classification	Name	Sex	Artistic talents	Acquisition	Dissolution
possessor	Kim Daegyun (김대균; 金大均)	Male	Jultagi	22 July 2000	
possessor	Kim Yeongcheol (김영철; 金永哲)	Male	Jultagi	30 June 1976	22 January 1988

== Works ==
- The film The King and the Clown
- The novel Jul(rope) (이청준, Yi Chong-jun, 李淸俊)

== See also ==
- Korean dance
- Korean culture
- Pungmul
- Juldarigi
- Slacklining
- Tightrope walking
