= Baltal (art form) =

Form of puppet theatre from Korea

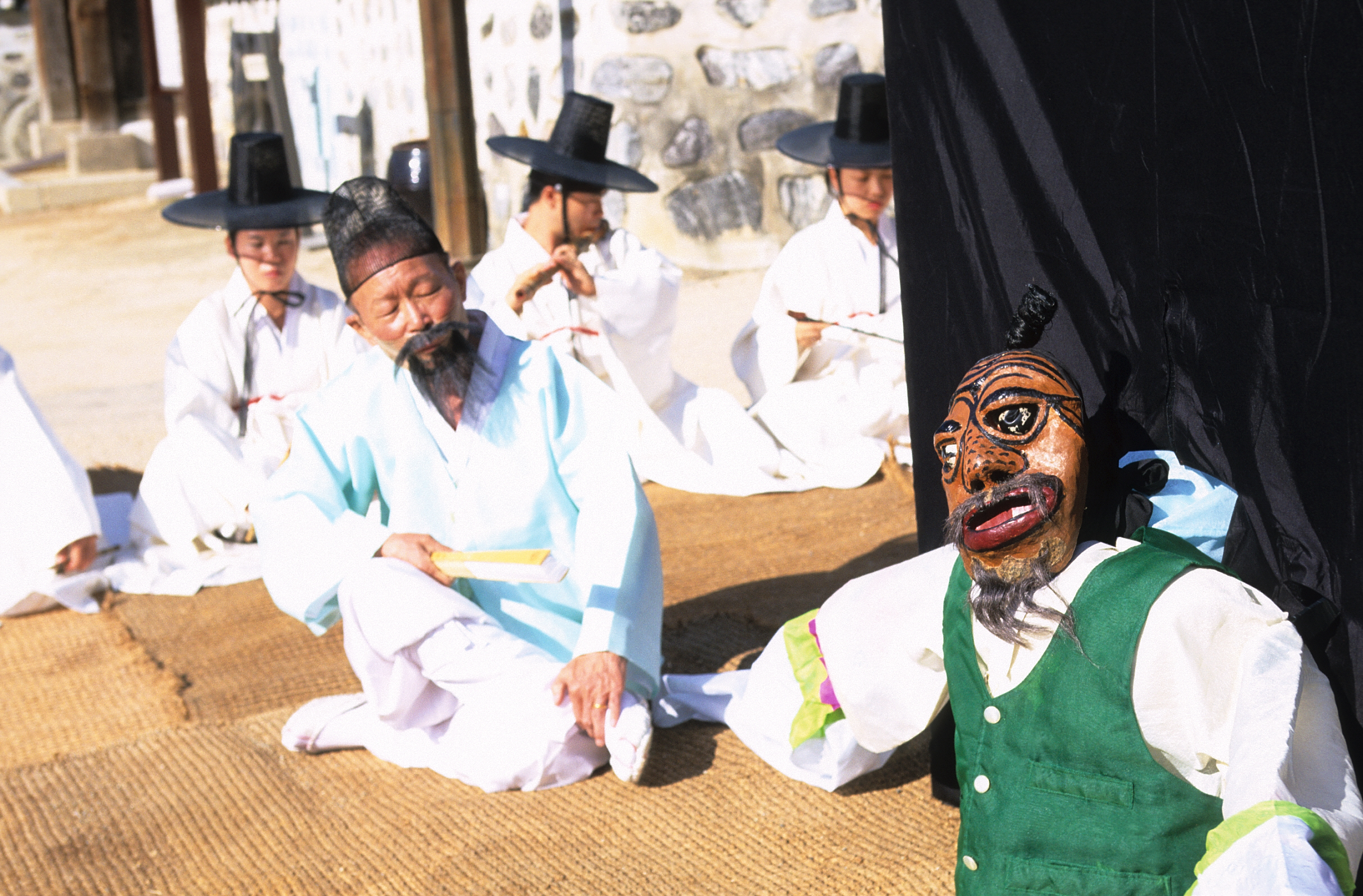
A performance (2003)

Baltal (Korean: 발탈; lit. foot mask) is a form of puppet theatre from Korea. It is one of Korea's Important Intangible Cultural Properties.

Baltal is unique in that the puppets used are manipulated with the feet, rather than the hands. The puppeteer lies on his back in a small curtained enclosure, with the puppet's head mounted on his feet. The puppet's arms are manipulated either by strings or by bamboo poles. Allegedly, baltal is said to have derived from the Korean namsadang puppet shows of itinerant traveling players which were located around Anseong. Initially, baltal were performed with a scarecrow-like head mask being put on the foot with the arms being moved by strings which are attached to the puppet’s hands. The tradition of bamboo pole system for hand movements was probably developed by the Korean puppeteers Nam Hyongwoo or Lee Dong-an who would attach bamboo poles to the puppet’s hands and control the poles with transparent strings which come over the backdrop and are controlled by the puppeteer from behind the screen. Baltal normally involved character based plays and folk stories. The puppeteer and the puppet characters often interact with the musicians, an actor (often a woman dressed in yellow jacket) or a narrator (who is often dressed in grey trousers and uses a fan). Often the story and dialogue is interspersed with songs, character dances, dialogue, songs and satirical jokes. The performance generally revolves around witticisms and clever dialogue, as well as songs, and the puppet interacts with the narrator and other performers. Musical accompaniment is provided by traditional instruments such as the piri, haegeum and janggu.
