= Seohaean baeyeonsingut =

Korean shamanic ritual

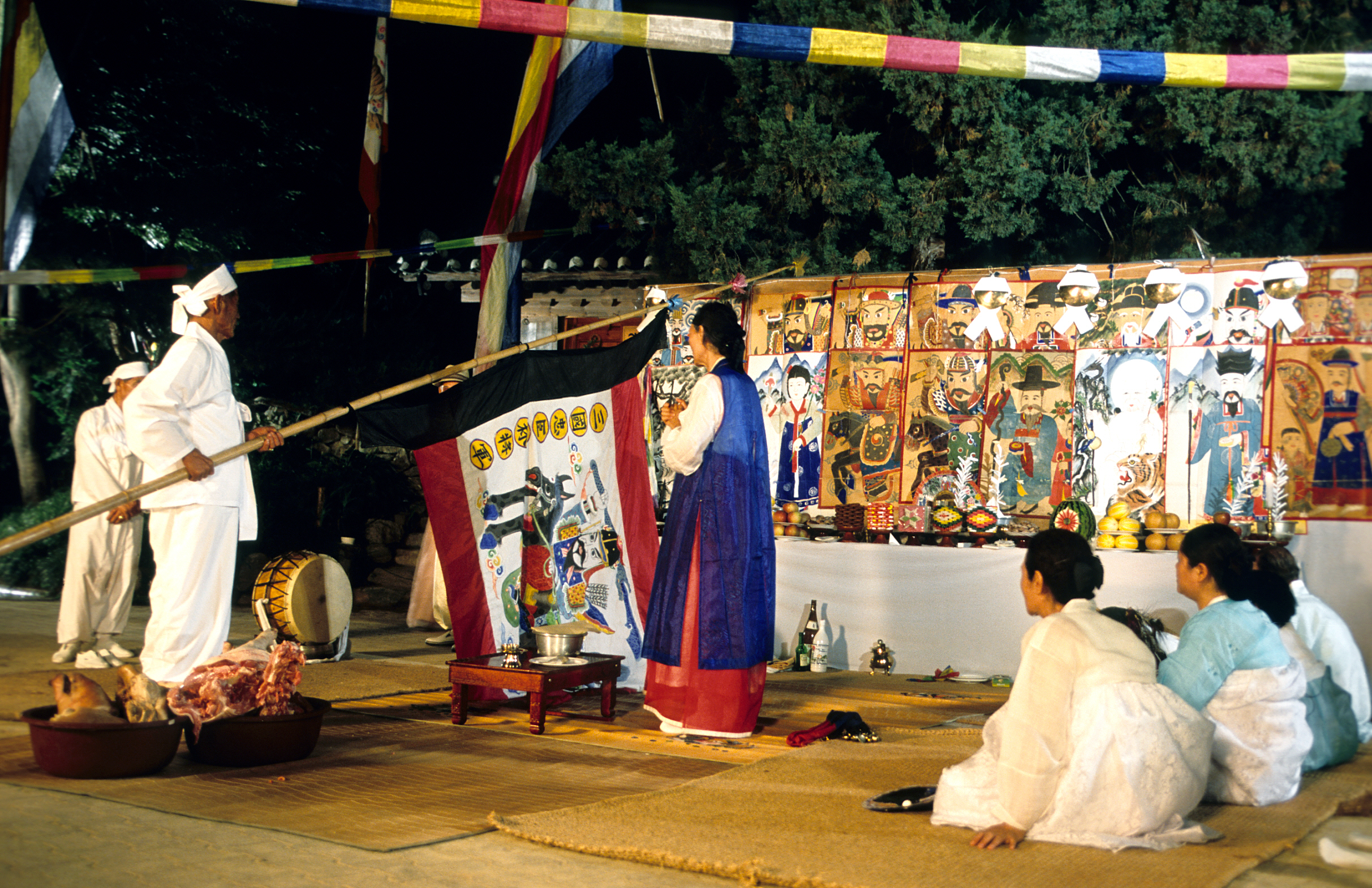

Korean name
- Hangul: 서해안배연신굿
- Hanja: 西海岸배연신굿
- Revised Romanization: Seohaean baeyeonsingut
- McCune–Reischauer: Sŏhaean baeyŏnsingut

Seohaean baeyeonsingut (Korean: 서해안배연신굿) is a shamanistic ritual that takes place on top of a boat in the Korea's West Coast region. It is performed to the gods to ask for abundant catches of fish at sea. It is South Korea's Important Intangible Cultural Properties 82–2.

July 7 is the day when fishermen lost at sea can see the Big Dipper, the brightest stars that will help them find their way like a compass. From olden times, Koreans believed that the Big Dipper was the constellation of stars that controlled the time of space and human lives. That is why humans have prayed for health and happiness in the direction of the Big Dipper. On the night of July 7, popular folklore also has it that two love stars, Gyunwoo and Jiknyu, meet and form the beautiful galaxy. This is another reason why the ritual is held on this day.

Seohaean Baeyeonsingut were performed annually in the villages in Haeju, Ongjin and the Yeonpyeong Island of Hwanghaedo, North Korea, with a prayer for peace in the village and a good catch.

The ritual is performed as a prayer to the gods of the heaven and the sea. It is believed that the rite is more effective if performed by a mudang (shaman), so it is traditionally performed with one.

== See also ==
- Korean Shamanism
- Shaman
- Korean Culture
