= Cheoyongmu =

Korean dance of Cheoyong

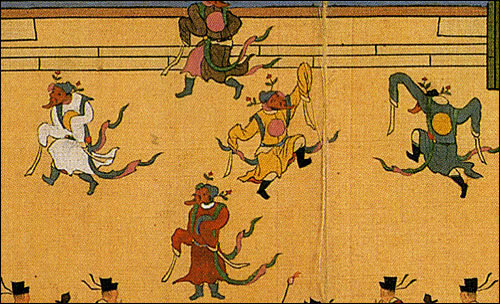
- The performance of Cheoyongmu being depicted in Gisa gyecheop (기사계첩)

Korean name
- Hangul: 처용무
- Hanja: 處容舞
- RR: cheoyongmu
- MR: ch'ŏyongmu

Cheoyongmu (Korean: 처용무) is a Korean mask dance based on the legend of Cheoyong (처용; 處容), a son of the Dragon King of the Eastern Sea. It is also the oldest surviving Korean court dance created during the Unified Silla period. Cheoyongmu has also been considered as a shamanistic dance because it was performed to drive off evil spirits at the end of the year.

The dancer's movements are usually majesty and vigour. It also depends on the style & tempo of music, which punctuated by various lyrical song recitations. The dance is always performed by five dancers, and its costumes and masks are noteworthy.

It is inscribed in UNESCO Intangible Cultural Heritage List from 2009 and enlisted as South Korean Intangible Cultural Property from 1971.

== See also ==
- Korean dance
- Korean mask
- Korean mythology
- Samguk yusa
- Akhak Gwebeom
- Korean shamanism
- Important Intangible Cultural Properties of Korea
