= Yeondeunghoe =

Lantern lightening festival in Korea celebrating the Buddha's Birthday

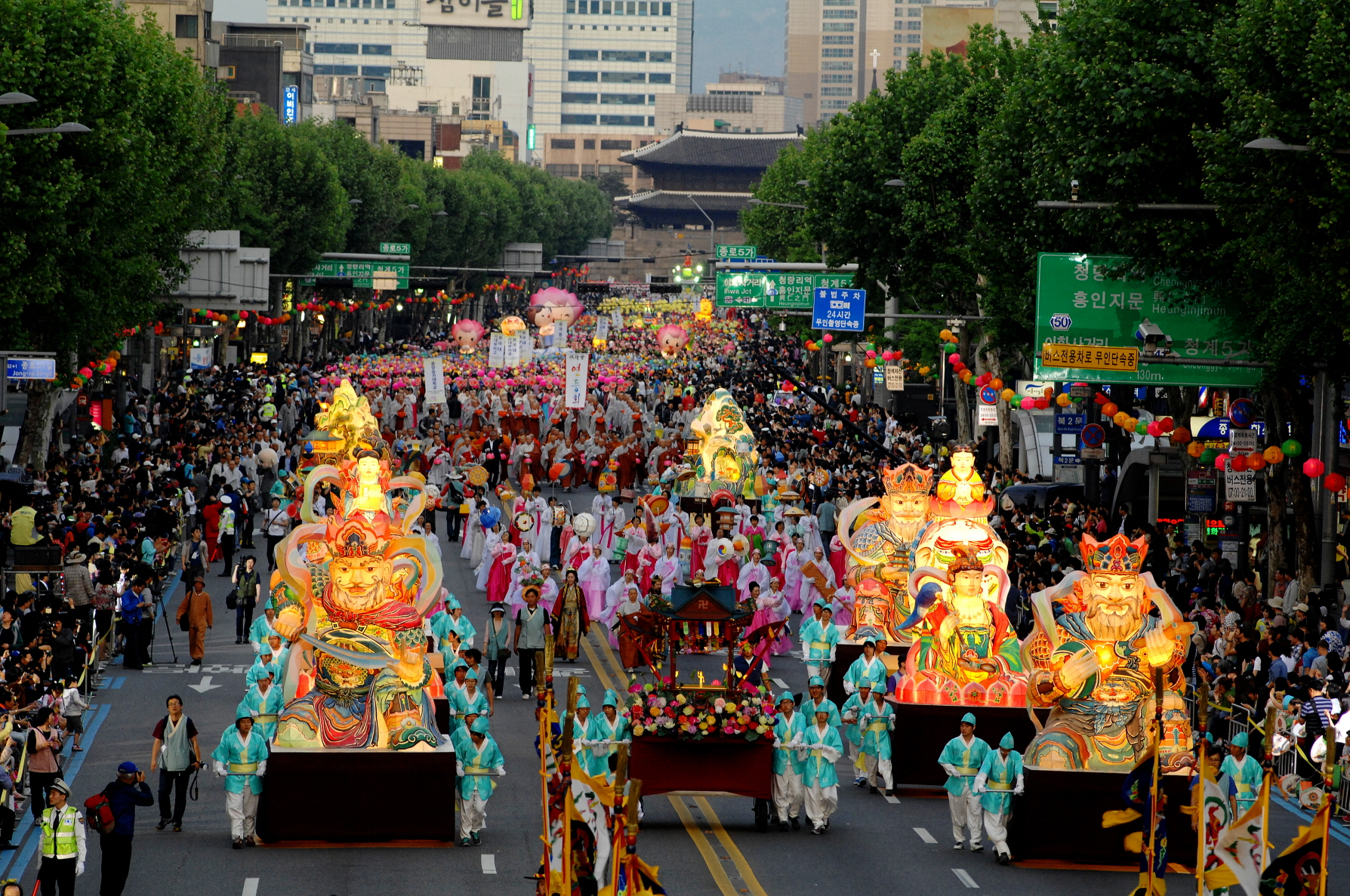
- Yeondeunghoe in Seoul Jongno in 2012

Korean name
- Hangul: 연등회
- Hanja: 燃燈會
- RR: Yeondeunghoe
- MR: Yŏndŭnghoe

Yeondeunghoe (Korean: 연등회; Hanja: 燃燈會; Korean pronunciation: [jʌndɯ̽ŋɦø]) is a lantern-lighting festival in Korea celebrating the Buddha's Birthday. The date of the celebration is marked on the Korean Lunar calendar as the eighth day of the fourth lunar month. The English translation of the name of the festival is written as Yeondeunghoe, Yeon Deung Hoe, or Yeondeung Hoe. Likewise, the exact English translation of the words, “Yeon” “Deung” “Hoe” are varied with suggested meanings as, “Lotus Lantern Festival” and “lighting a lantern.” The lanterns represent "light, hope and unity".

== Origins ==
The origin of Yeondeunghoe is thought to be Palgwanhoe started in 551 (12th year of the reign of King Jinheung). With a 1,200 year history, records reference the event at Hwangnyongsa Temple, located in Gyeongju, in 866 during the Silla Dynasty (57 B.C. – 935 A.D.). In Silla the lantern festivals were a combination of Buddhist lantern offerings and ancestral rites to the dragon god to protect farmers and the nation.

The beginning of the festival is marked with the ritual bathing in water of a sculpture of the Buddha as a baby. A ritual ladle is used to spoon water over the head and shoulders of the image of Buddha.

== Lanterns ==
Displayed at Buddhist temples, private homes and parades, lanterns come in all shapes and sizes. Popular lantern subjects include drums, cranes, fish, and flowers. As recently as 2014, lantern creations include historical figures like King Sejong and the creation of Hangul script, cartoon characters, detailed figures in traditional Korean dress, phoenixes, dragons, tigers, and a Korean style ship with moving masts. The Buddhist roots of the Lotus Lantern Festival is in the most prolific lantern design, the lotus flower. In Buddhism, the lotus is associated with dignity, the sublime, and the awakening of the devotee’s true nature. Lotus flower lantern workshops are common sights across the communities that celebrate the festival not only in South Korea, but around the world.

Custom designed lanterns made for Yeondeunghoe have an underlying frame covered with a paper sheathing and internal lights. A lantern frame is made of split bamboo or aluminum armature wire. Each piece of the armature is individually shaped to fit the form and secured together with paper tape or thin wire. The three dimensional wire shape is covered in Hanji paper, a traditional Korean paper handmade from mulberry tree bark. The properties of Hanji, with its overlapping plant fibers, add to its strength and durability of a material for use on a lantern. Individual Hanji paper pieces are cut to fit over the pattern of frame openings and secured in place with glue. The sheathing may also be made of silk.

Simple lotus lanterns, made in community workshops and family homes, are made with commercially manufactured white spherical lanterns, tissue paper rectangles and glue. The manufactured tissue paper rectangles are white on one half and a dyed color on the other. Tissue paper petals are twisted by hand into a point and held in place with a little bit of glue, attached in rows until the base lantern is covered. Traditionally candles were used to illuminate the lanterns, but LED lights with battery packets are considered safer and easy to use.

== Recognition ==
Yeondeunghoe is inscribed in UNESCO Intangible Cultural Heritage List from 2020 and enlisted as South Korean Intangible Cultural Property from 2011. Per the UNESCO Intangible Cultural Heritage Committee, religious events are normally excluded from consideration.[6] However upon reflection, the Committee’s decision to include the festival hinged on its inclusivity and cultural diversity, noting the removal of social boundaries between the attendees during the celebration. People come together to enjoy the thousands of glowing lanterns and to wish for happiness for themselves and others.

== Modern celebrations ==
In 2005 to celebrate 40th anniversary of the normalization of diplomatic relations between two countries, lanterns from Japanese festivals in three regions of Akita, Aomori and Yamagata joined other Korean lanterns at Yeondeunghoe.

Yeondeunghoe is celebrated across the entirety of South Korea every year but one in Jongno District of Seoul Capital where Jogyesa, the chief temple of the biggest Korean Buddhist Jogye Order resides, is best known.

In 2020, Yeondeunghoe was cancelled due to the Coronavirus pandemic despite revising its plans and reducing its participants. This was the fourth time in modern Korean history since 1960 that Yeondeunghoe in Jongro was cancelled. The first and the third were due to the martial law proclaimed during two of the major democratic movements in the country, April Revolution in 1961 and Seoul Spring in 1980. The second was in 1970 when the Seoul City government refused to grant the permit for street usage citing expected traffic jams.

== Gallery ==
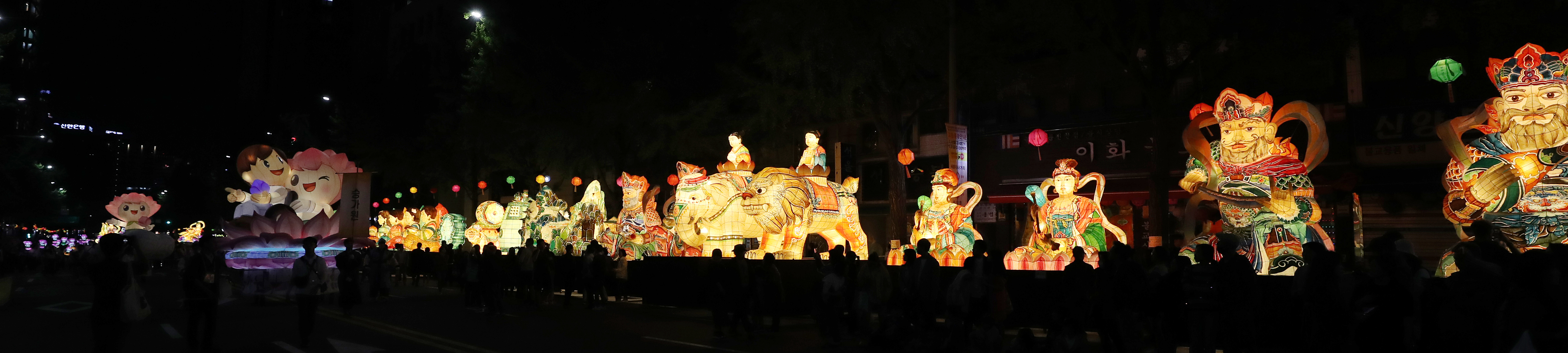

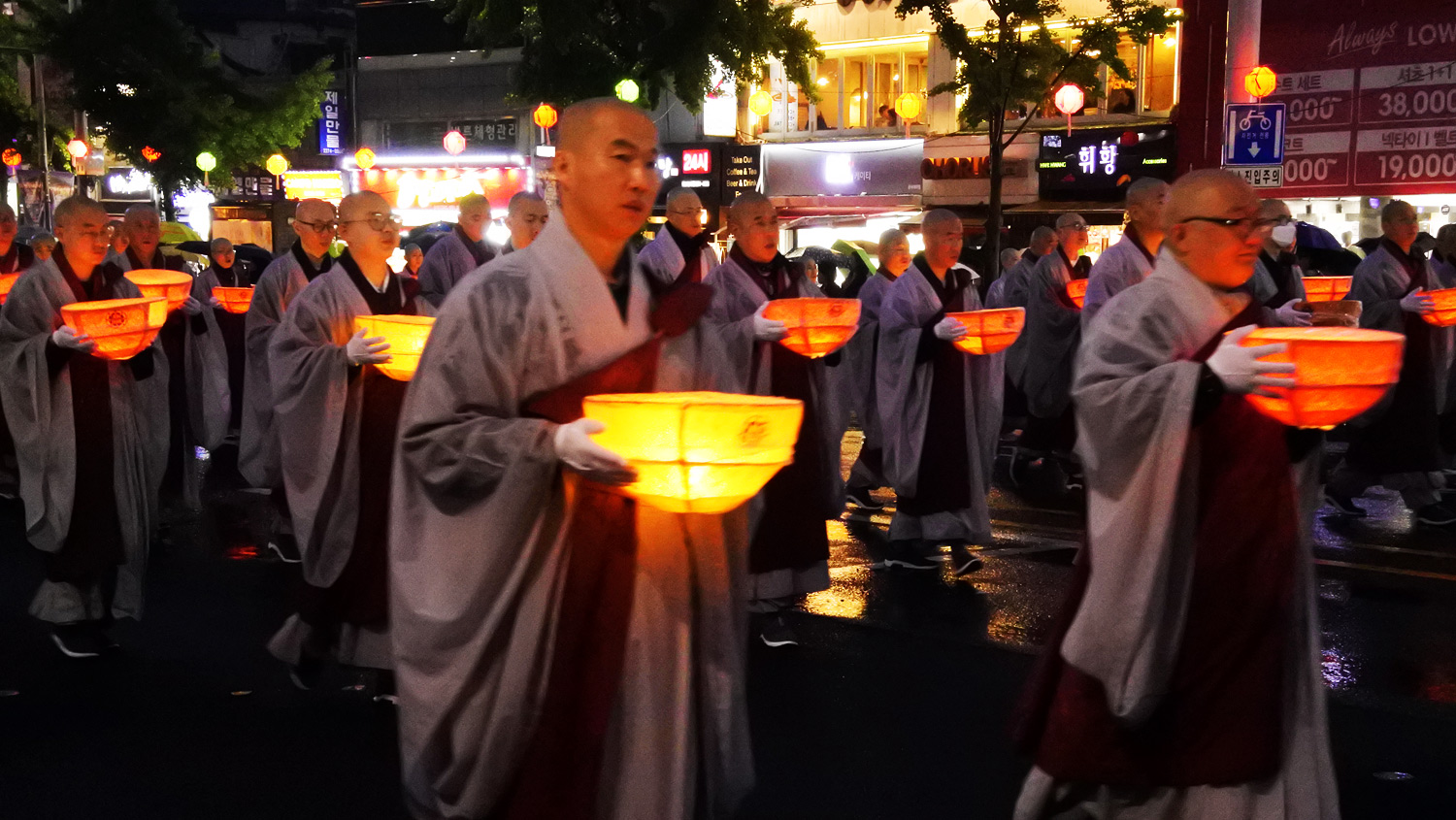

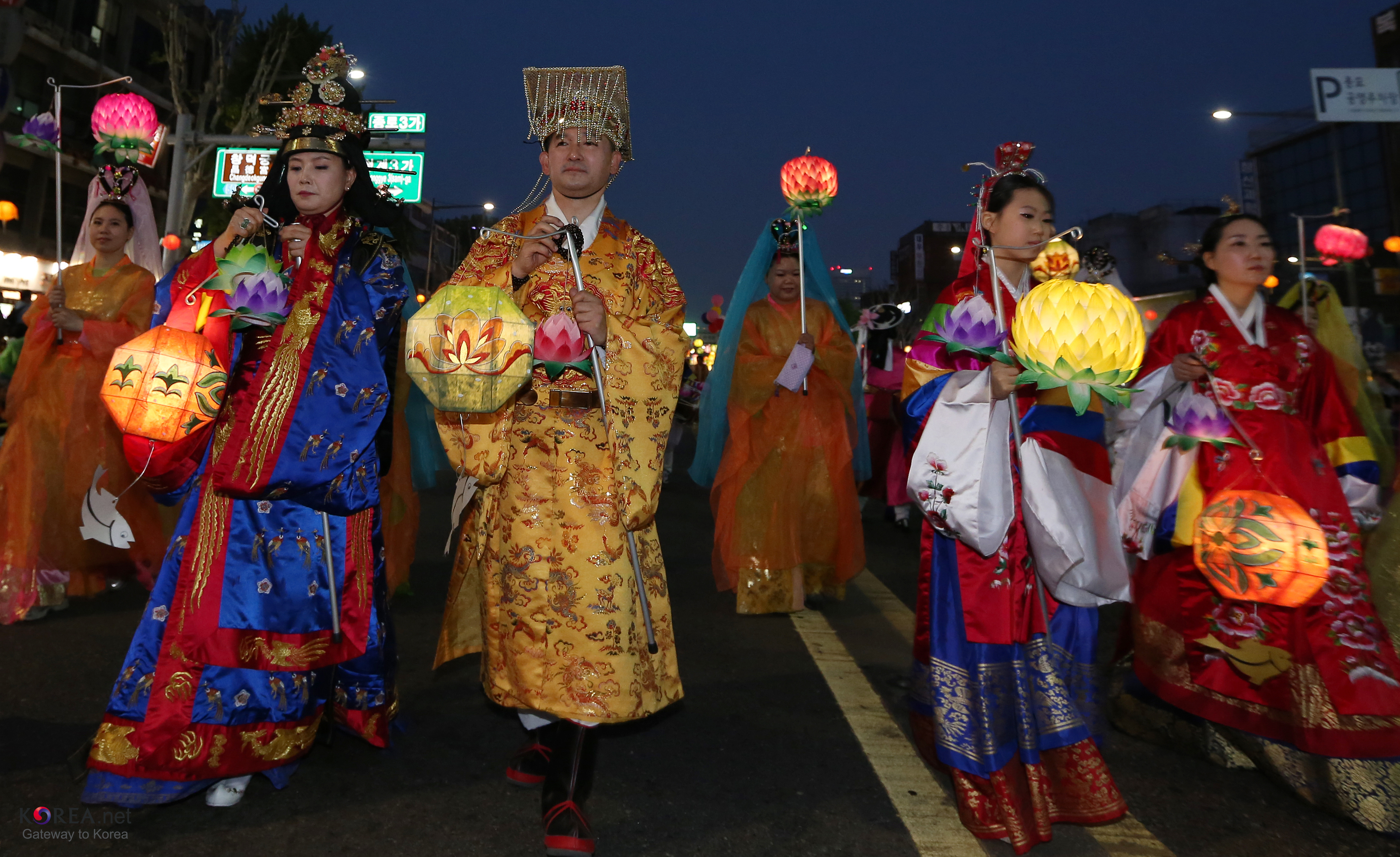

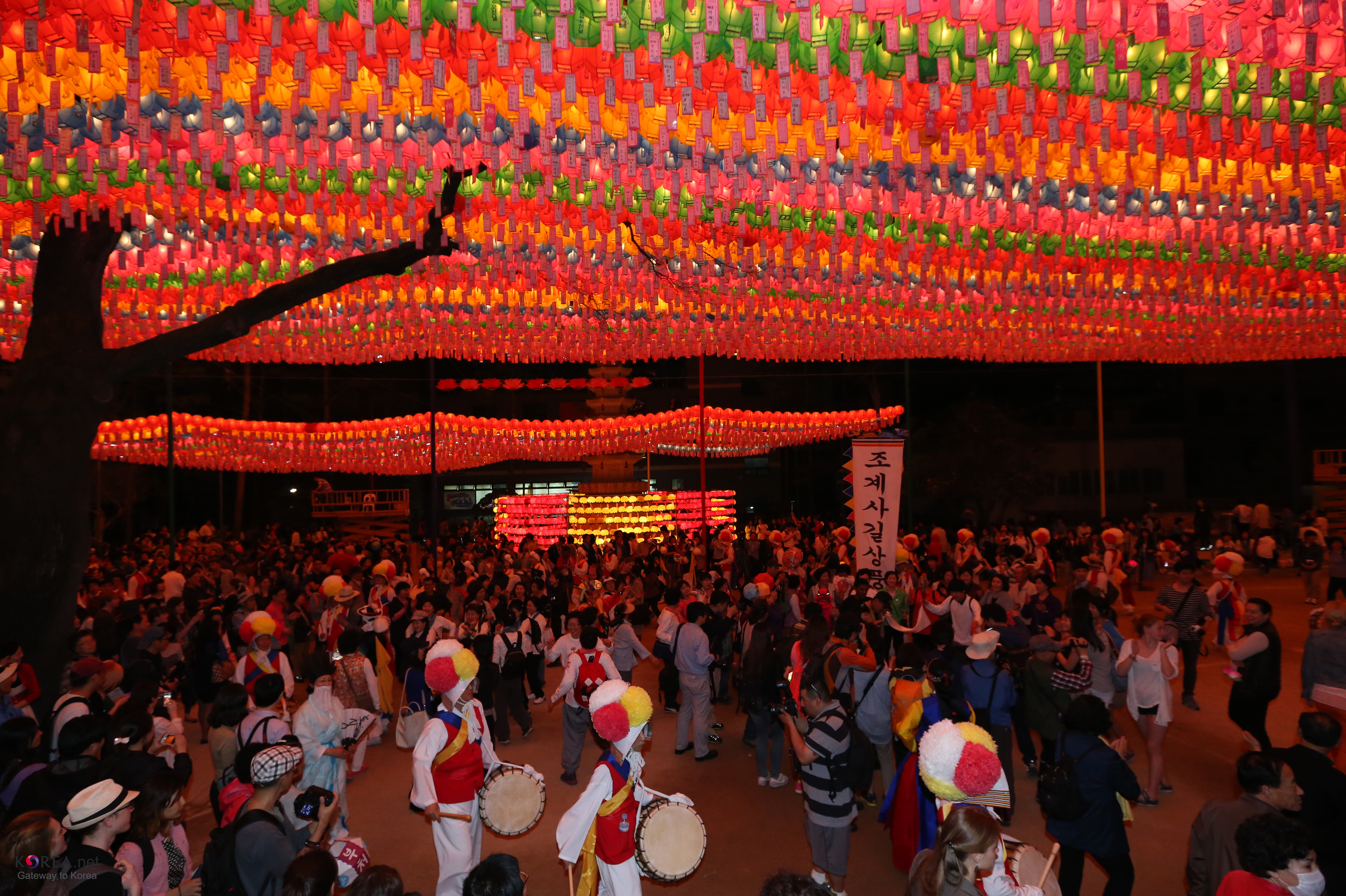

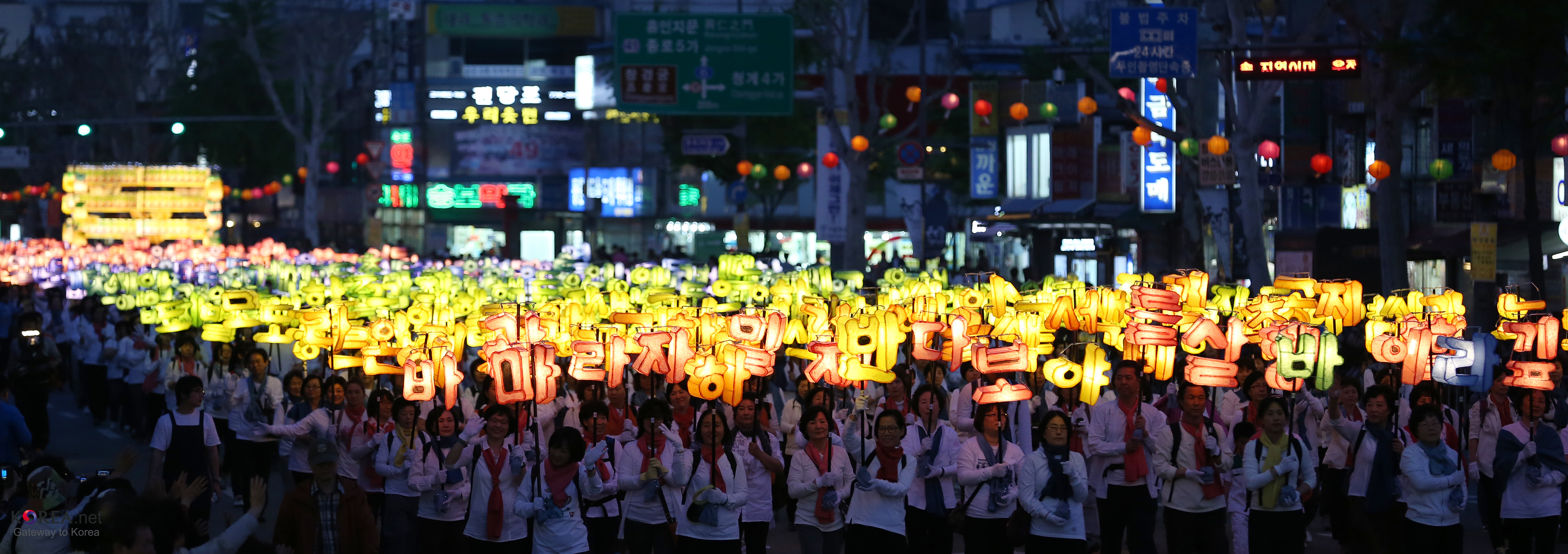

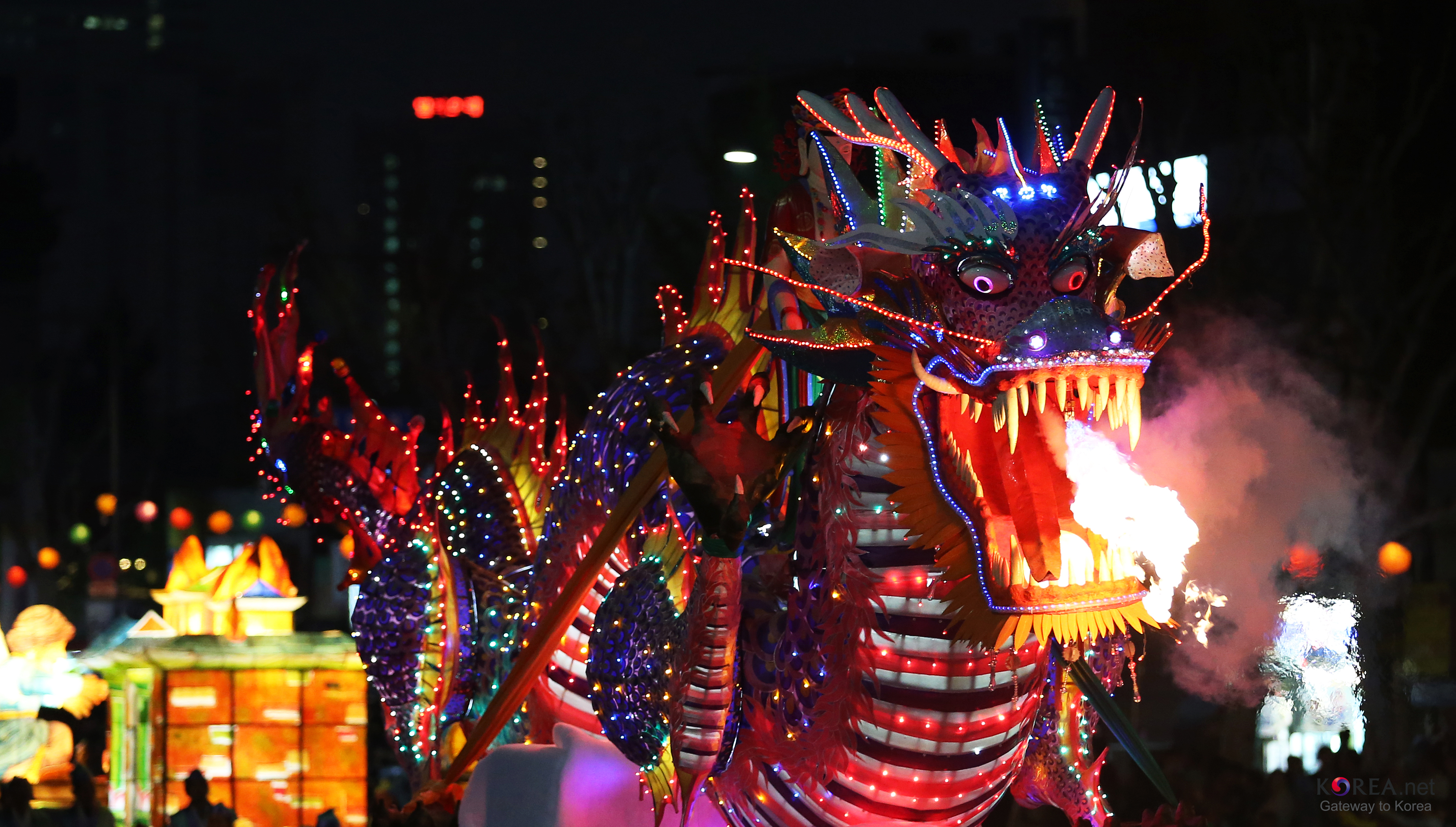

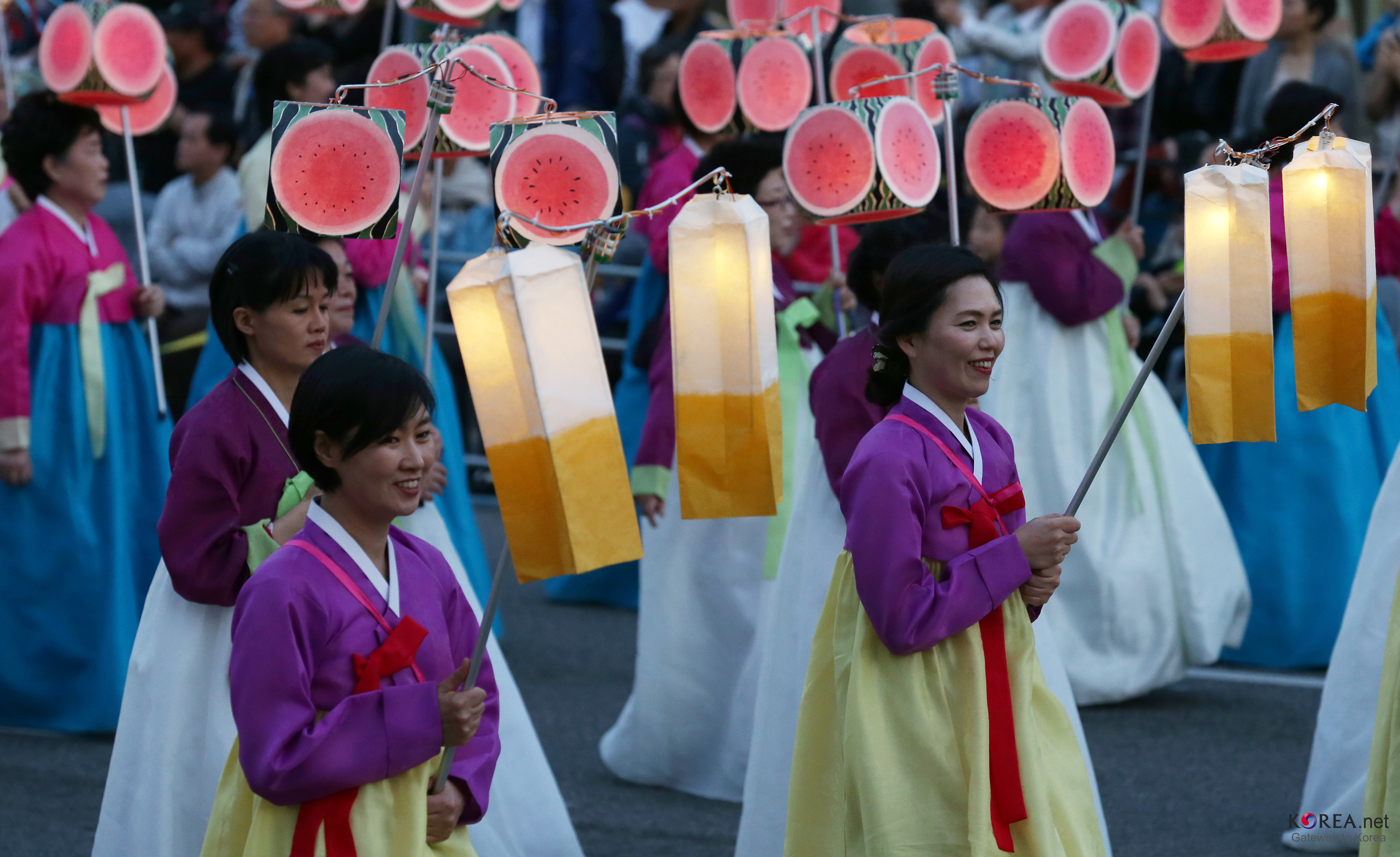

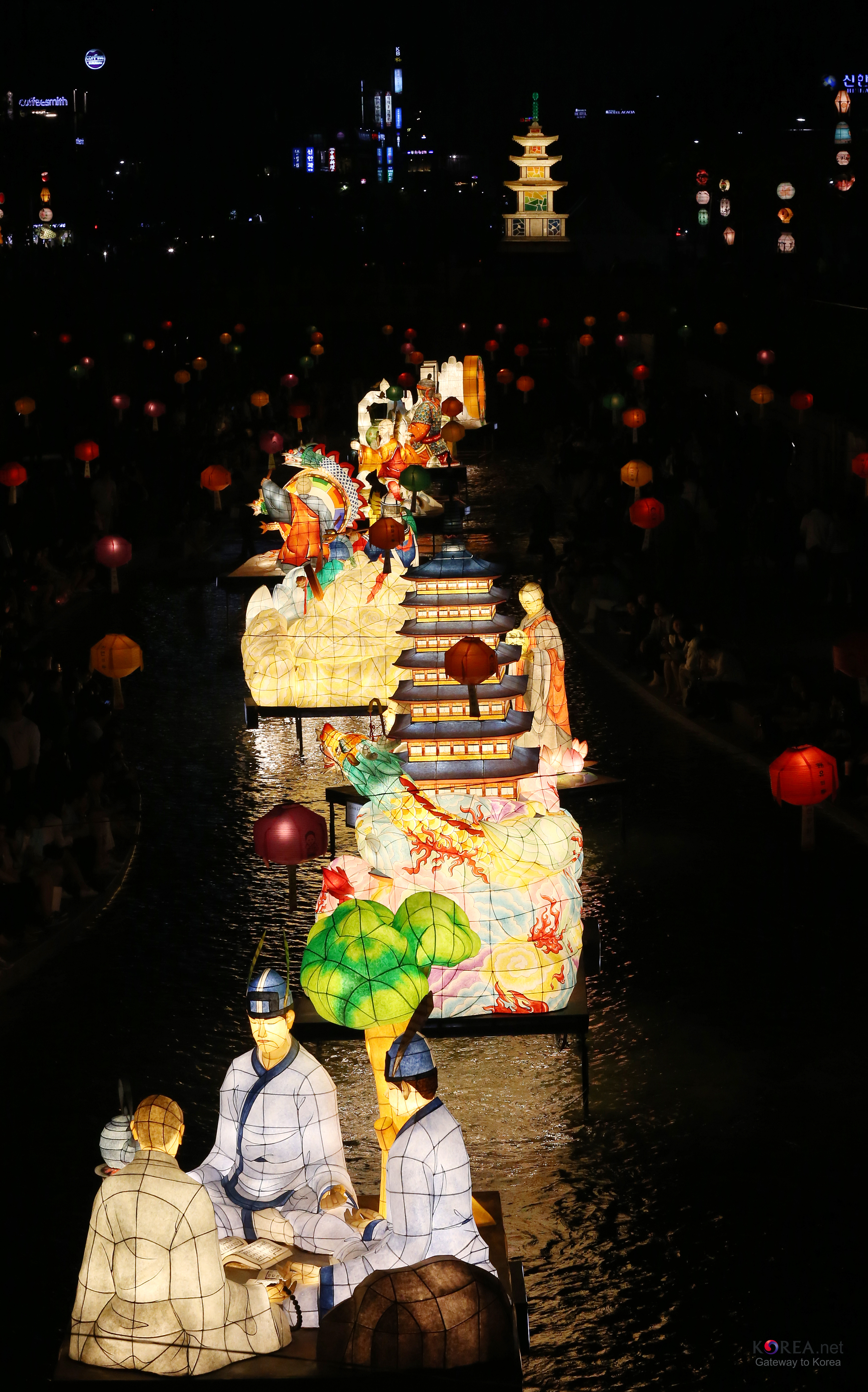

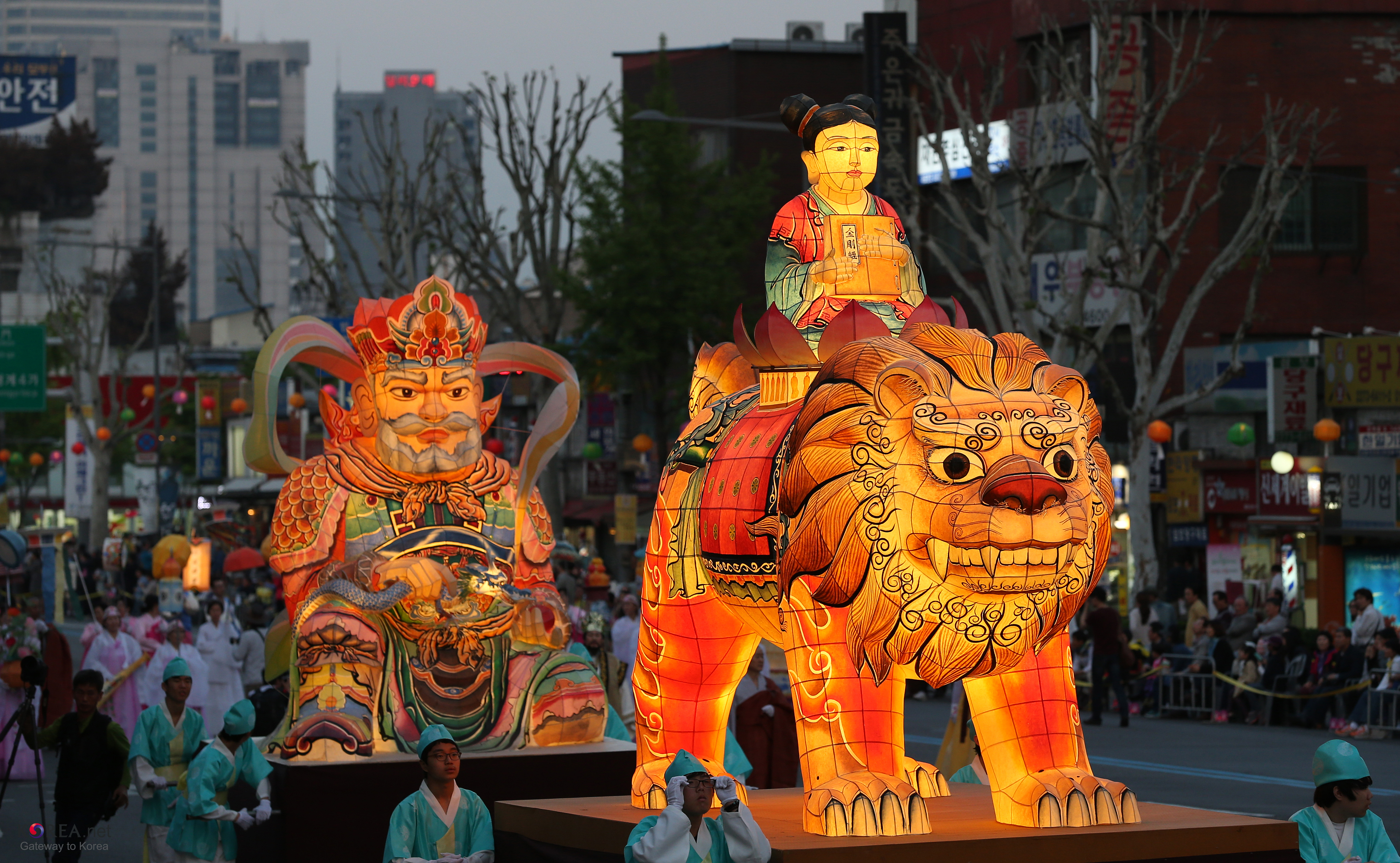

== See also ==
- Yeondeunghoe website funded by Korean government
- UNESCO's page for Yeondeunghoe
