= Chajeon nori =

Traditional Korean chariot battle

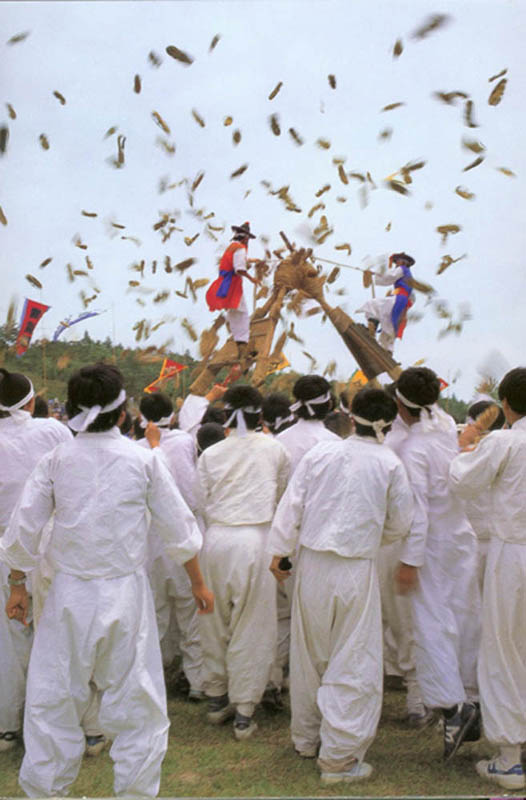

Korean name
- Hangul: 차전놀이
- Hanja: 車戰놀이
- RR: chajeonnori
- MR: ch'ajŏnnori

Chajeon nori (Korean: 차전놀이), occasionally translated as Juggernaut Battle, is a traditional Korean game usually played by men, originating in the Andong region. It may have originated as a commemoration of Wang Kŏn's victory over Kyŏn Hwŏn at the Battle of Gochang (Andong) in 930, near the end of the Later Three Kingdoms period. It resembles a jousting match, with the two commanders are atop large log frames maneuvered by their teams. These trapezoidal log frames are known as dongchae, and are composed of two 10-meter-long logs tied together with straw rope. The dongchae lie horizontally at the beginning of play, but then are hoisted up by their team. Some members of the team carry the dongchae, while others fight with the opposing team to help their side advance.

The commanders are chosen from among the team at the beginning of play. The teams are traditionally named "east" and "west." A team wins by forcing the other team's dongchae to the ground. After their victory, the members of the winning team traditionally toss their straw sandals upward.

== See also ==
- Korean culture
