= Ganggangsullae =

Korean circle dance

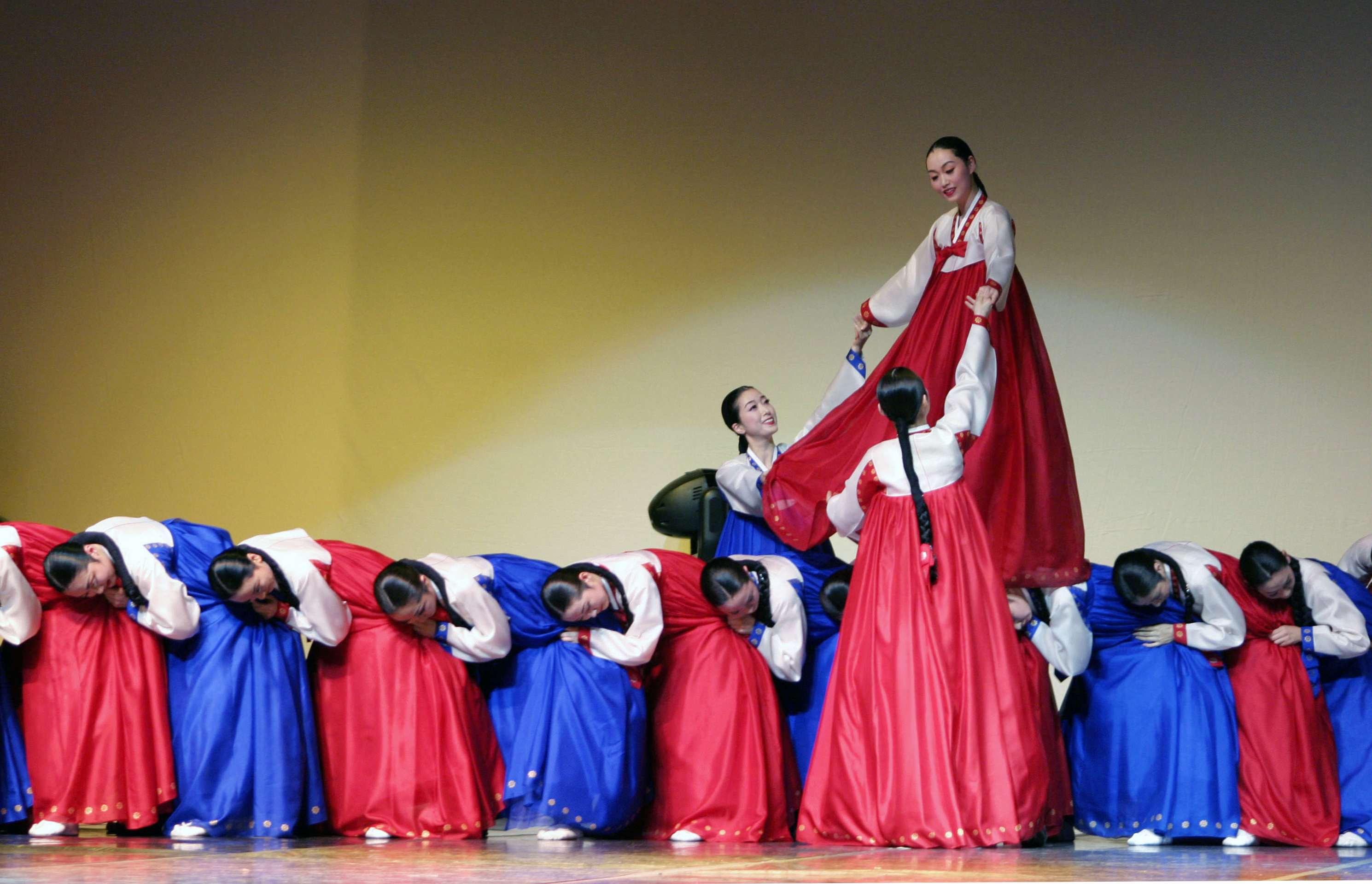

Korean name
- Hangul: 강강술래 or 강강수월래
- Hanja: 姜降戌來 or 强羌水越來
- Revised Romanization: Ganggangsullae; Ganggangsuwollae
- McCune–Reischauer: Kanggangsullae; Kanggangsuwŏllae

Ganggangsullae song

Ganggangsullae (Korean: 강강술래) is an ancient Korean dance that was first used to bring about a bountiful harvest and has developed into a cultural symbol for Korea. It incorporates singing, dancing, and playing and is exclusively performed by women. The dance is mostly performed in the southwestern coastal province of South Jeolla Province. It is often associated with the Chuseok holiday and Daeboreum and is performed when the full moon rose above the mountains They dance all night and continue to play folk games in circles. The performance starts with a late Ganggangsullae and changes to a 'Jajeun-Ganggangsullae', which are characterized by the most beautiful and feminine charms of late Ganggangsullae, and 'Jung-Ganggangsullae" only in Haenam and Jindo regions.

The dance was registered as the UNESCO's intangible cultural heritage from Korea in 2009.

== Etymology ==
The etymology of Ganggangsullae is not clear, however the term's origins can be guessed by interpreting the name in either indigenous Korean or Hanja characters. Some theorize that the term was derived from the indigenous Korean words, in which 'Gang' of Ganggangsullae means circle and 'sullae', which derived from the words 'sunu' or 'sulla', means a wagon or to alert. In combination, the term means to wagon or alert around in circle. Additionally, in the Jeolla dialect, 'ganggang' translates to 'surroundings' or 'in circles', and 'sullae', meaning 'patrol'. This interpretation frames 'ganggangsullae' means to "Beware of your surroundings".

Others suggests that the word Ganggangsullae was a hanja phrase meaning "a powerful barbarian is going to invade our country", given it was a chant to make the public aware of enemy invaders. This meaning was derived from the history of the naval commander Yi Sun-sin utilizing ganggangsullae in military strategy, but there is little evidence to support this theory.

== History ==
=== Ancient times ===
The dance is thought to have originated in ancient times when the ancient Koreans believed that the Sun, Moon, and Earth controlled the universe. Participants would dance under the brightest full moon of the year in order to wish for a fertile harvest.

Actually, Ganggangsullae is still held in Korea's most common festivities such as New Year's Day, Daeboreum, Dano, and Chuseok. Since Chuseok has its largest size of the moon of the year, the dance itself is considered as a notable event on Chuseok holidays by dozens of young women dancing and singing all together.

=== Joseon dynasty ===
Before Joseon, Goryeo dynasty maintained liberal atmosphere of trade and communications under the strong power of Buddhism. Newly founded dynasty Joseon needed to rebuild the country in a different manner, which called for another national policy - Confucianism. Under the strict Confucian influence expansion, the female status started to degrade sharply, resulting in more difficulties and obstacles for even noble women. For example, women should wear long hood by covering all the face and head while going out of house is not allowed. Under this kind of social atmosphere, the dance gave women the chance to go outside and sing together away from invisible restraints.

In the 16th century, during the Japanese invasion of Korea, Admiral Yi Sun-sin ordered women to do this dance in military uniform to intimidate the Japanese. The women were said to have dressed in military uniform and danced on Mount Okmae (옥매산). The Japanese scouts thus overestimated the strength of the Korean troops.

=== Present ===
Nowadays, Ganggangsullae is passed down to younger generations in music class at local schools and students can learn how to perform folk dance, including the origin of the artistic movement, exercising melody skills. Notably, there is an instance that the Korean dance is getting into the pop culture. The Korean pop group ATEEZ, for example, includes Ganggangsullae in their performances featuring the movement and general references of Korean culture.

== How to Perform Ganggangsullae ==
=== Wonmu ===
It is the main action of Ganggangsullae, which is spinning counterclockwise.

=== Holding hands and Walking ===
When holding hands with each other, the back of the right hand should be above, and the palm of the left hand should be above. When walking, the heel should be on the ground first.

=== Running ===
People doing 'running' have to run faster than 'walking'. They shouldn't open their legs very much, and they have to raise their knees while running.

=== Gatekeeper Play ===
Except the first two-person, they make a line to be ready to go through the gate. The first and second person makes the gate, and then the right next person who went through the gate makes the gate, while the person who made the gate returns to the line.

=== Stomping Roof Tile ===
Except three people, they stand in a line lowering their heads. One person stands on their waist and starts to walk on them. The other two people holds her hands not to fall down.

== Characteristics ==
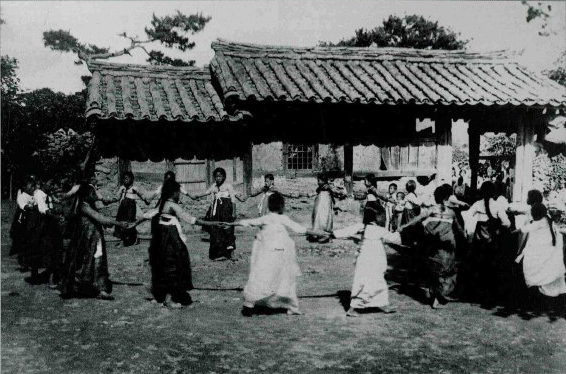
Ganggangsullae, 1891–1930

Traditionally, this dance is performed only by women at night without any instruments. Young and old women dance in a circle at night under the moonlight. They go outside in traditional Korean clothing, hold each other's hands, make a circle, and start rotating clockwise. The lead singer sings a line and everyone sings the refrain 'ganggangsullae'. The song tempo progressively becomes faster. They sing about their personal hardships, relationships, and desires. During the dance, the women play a variety of games. The dance can last until dawn.

=== Jangdan ===
Jangdan, meaning “long and short,” is a foundational rhythmic pattern in Korean dance and music that distinguishes it from Western traditions. This unique rhythmic framework features a repetitive pattern integral to the music’s structure and is inspired by the natural pulse of breathing, mirroring the body's internal rhythms.

Throughout a performance, the jangdan pattern can be dynamically adjusted, allowing drummers to alter the rhythm in real-time. This adaptability is crucial, as it affects the dance’s tempo, enabling movements to accelerate or decelerate in response to the changing rhythm.

In Ganggangsullae, the songs follow a deliberate tempo progression that significantly influences the dance's rhythm and energy. The performance typically begins at a slow tempo, known as jinyangjo, setting a contemplative and steady pace. As the performance evolves, the tempo gradually increases to a moderate speed, referred to as jungmori or jungjungmori, introducing a more dynamic rhythm that enhances participant engagement.

The performance culminates with a fast tempo called jajinmori, where the rhythm becomes rapid and energetic, reflecting the heightened excitement of the dance’s finale. This progression through tempos enriches the Ganggangsullae experience, mirroring the performance's evolving nature and concluding in an exhilarating celebration.

The primary instrument used to play jangdan is the janggu, an hourglass-shaped drum known for its complex rhythmic patterns. Additionally, the buk, a barrel drum, can also be used. The interplay between these instruments creates the rich, textured rhythms central to Korean musical and dance traditions.

=== Singing ===
Minyo, meaning song of people, is a korean folk song that spread among the people. It has two categories, tosok and tongsok. Tosok encompasses songs performed by ordinary people for purposes such as work, play, and ritualistic ceremonies. In contrast, tongsok consists of widely popular songs that are typically performed by professional singers. Ganggangsullae follows a call (maegineun-sori) and response (banneun-sori) model like most Korean folk songs. An example of lyrics that can be used for the dance is:

Sullaesullae ganggangsullae, the moon is rising, the moon is rising

The moon is rising from the east sea, from the east window

In August on harvest moon day, this is the game women play

On autumn evening

When the moon shines bright through the paulownia tree leaves

I can't help but think of my love

My love, my love, don't be mad at me. The padded socks I made for you

Who will I give them to if not to you?

=== Dancing ===
Ganggangsullae begins with dancers forming a complete circle. This circle then undergoes a dynamic transformation into various shapes, which can include spiral patterns, concentric circles, and circles of differing sizes, before disassembling into straight lines and eventually reforming into a full circle. The dance routine is typically short and repetitive and choreographed to reflect and convey cultural values, social beliefs, and various aspects of life in traditional Korean society. These choreographic elements are designed to capture the essence of communal life and social traditions. Historically, the phases of the moon were integral to agricultural practices in ancient Korea, guiding the timing of planting and harvesting. People would hold festivals and dances for the full moons power. The starting circle represents the full moon. This is why Gangangsullae is performed under a full moon and during Chuseok.

== See also ==
- Chuseok
- Maypole
