= Deer dance (folk dance) =

Type of folk dance

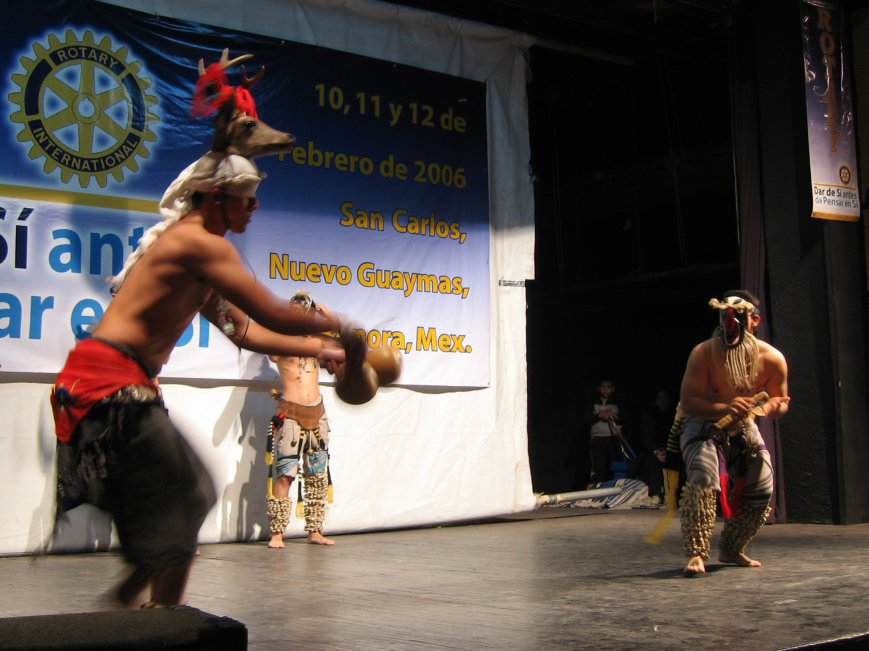
Deer dance of Sonora and Sinaloa, Mexico

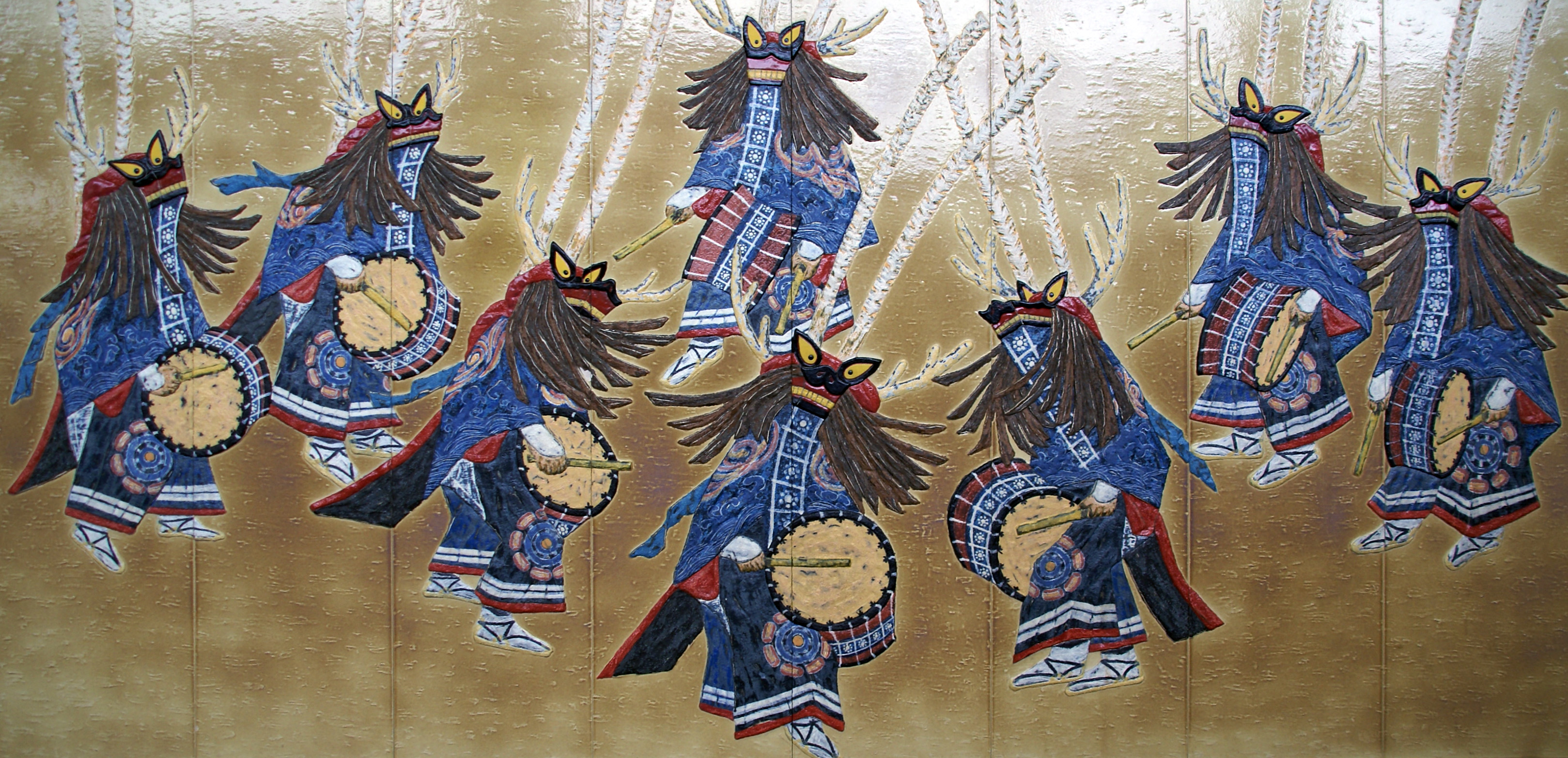
Deer dance of Hanamaki, Iwate

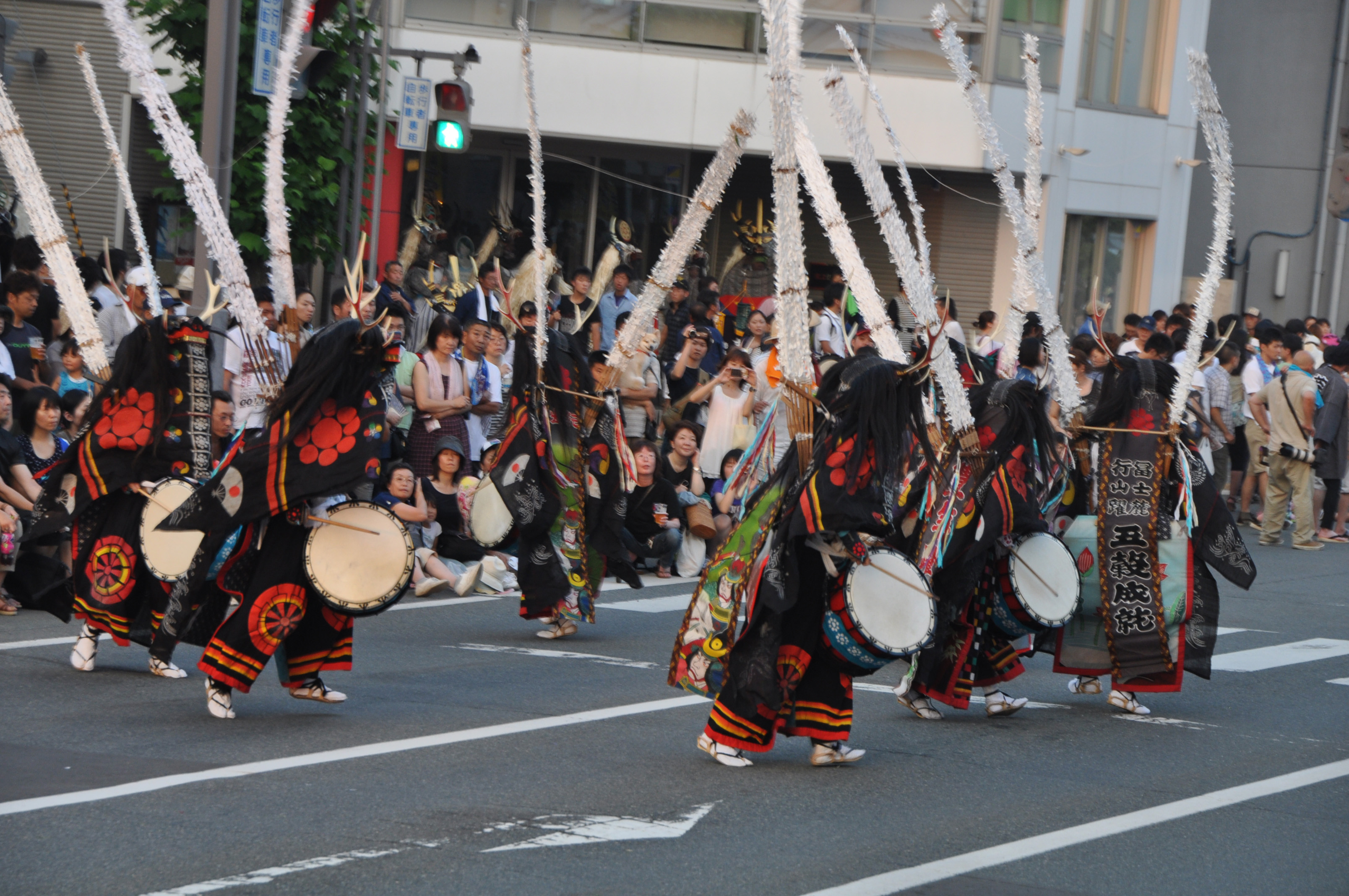
Deer dance of Oshu, Iwate, performed at Kitakami Michinoku Traditional Dance Festival

A deer dance is any of the world's folk dances performed by people dressed as deer.

== Guatemala ==
The Mayan Deer Dance is an important part of the culture of Guatemala.

== India ==
- Manattam in Tamil Nadu

== Japan ==
- Deer dance (鹿踊, shishi-odori) is widely practised in Japan, particularly in Northeastern Japan.
- Deer dance in the style of Kanezu (video)

== Mexico ==
- The Danza del Venado of the Mayo and Yaqui people of Sonora and Sinaloa
- Danza del Venado del Ballet Folklorico de Mexico de Amalia Hernandez, en el Palacio de Bellas Artes, video por Viajes Segara

== United Kingdom ==
- Abbots Bromley Horn Dance

== See also ==
- Lion dance
- Tiger dance
- Folk dances of Mexico
- Yaqui music
- Tamil India § Arts and dance
