= Devil's sword dance =

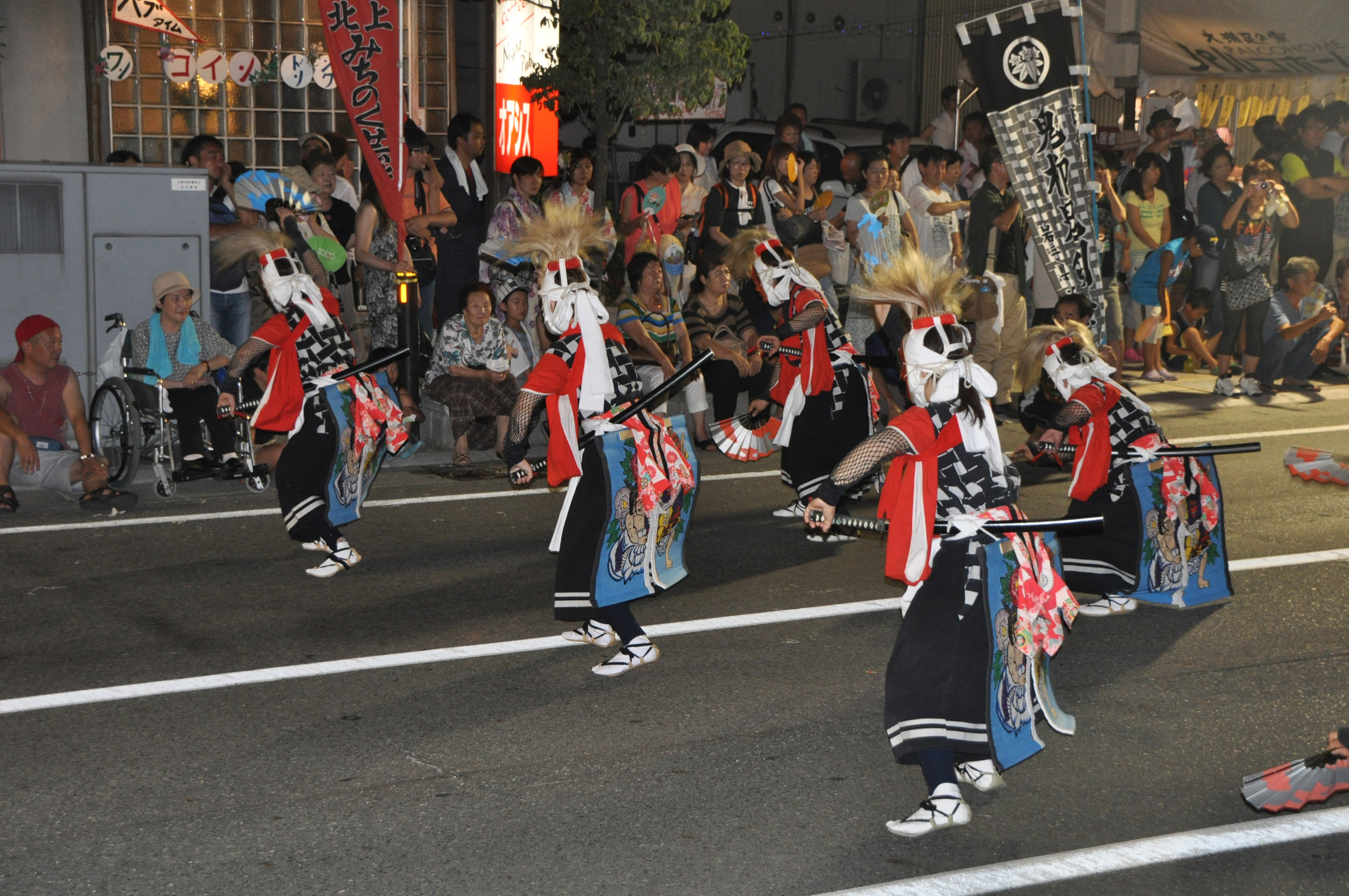
Devil's Sword Dance of Kitakami, Iwate, performed on the street in Kitakami Michinoku Traditional Dance Festival

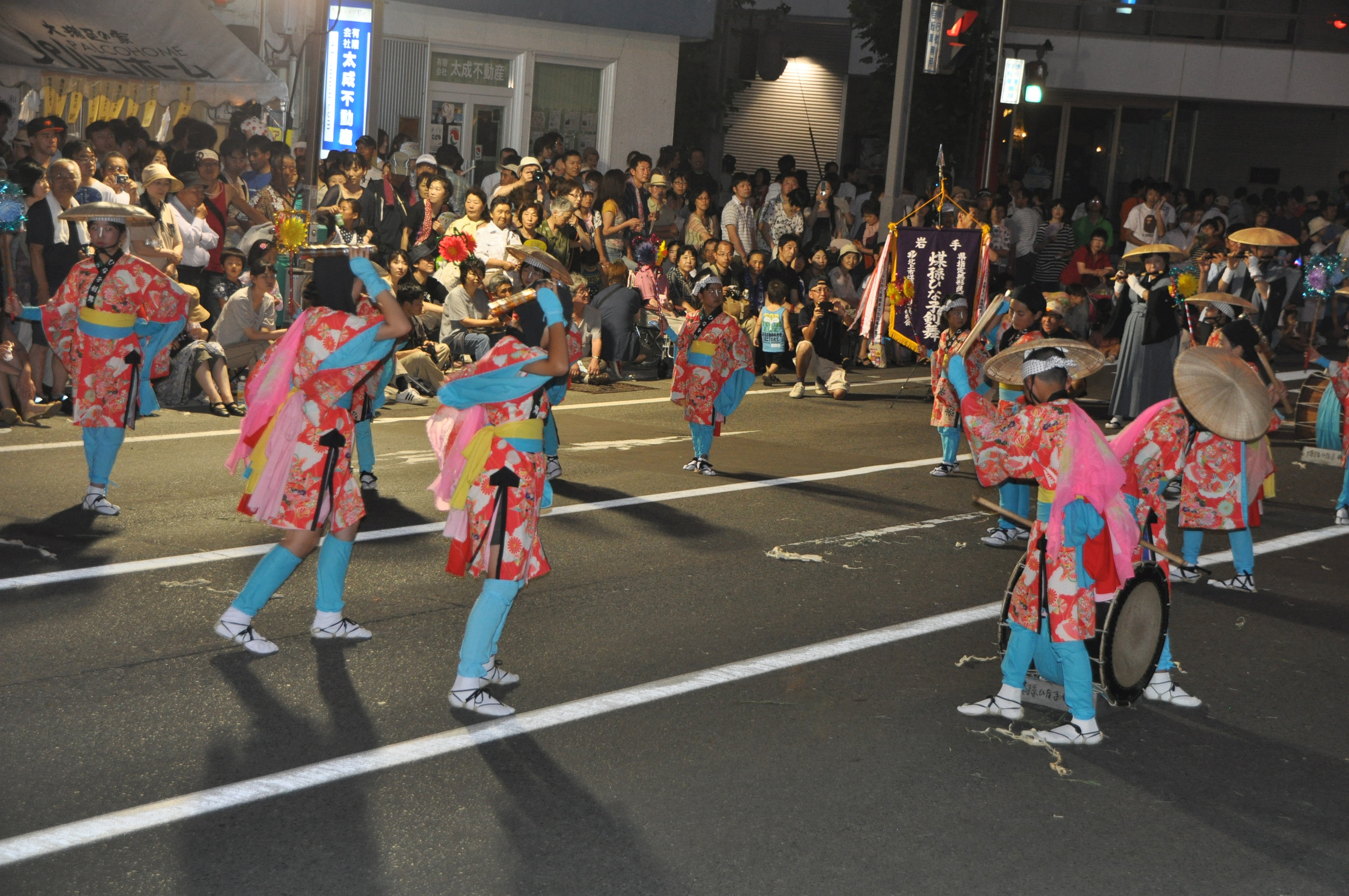
Children also form their own groups to perform Devil's Sword Dance in Kitakami Michinoku Traditional Dance Festival

The Devil's Sword Dance (鬼剣舞, onikenbai) is a sword dance usually performed by a group of eight dancers, especially popular in northeastern Japan. It is so called because the dancers wear face masks which look like demons (鬼, oni).

== See also ==
- Kitakami Michinoku Traditional Dance Festival
