= Yaqui music =

Native American music genre

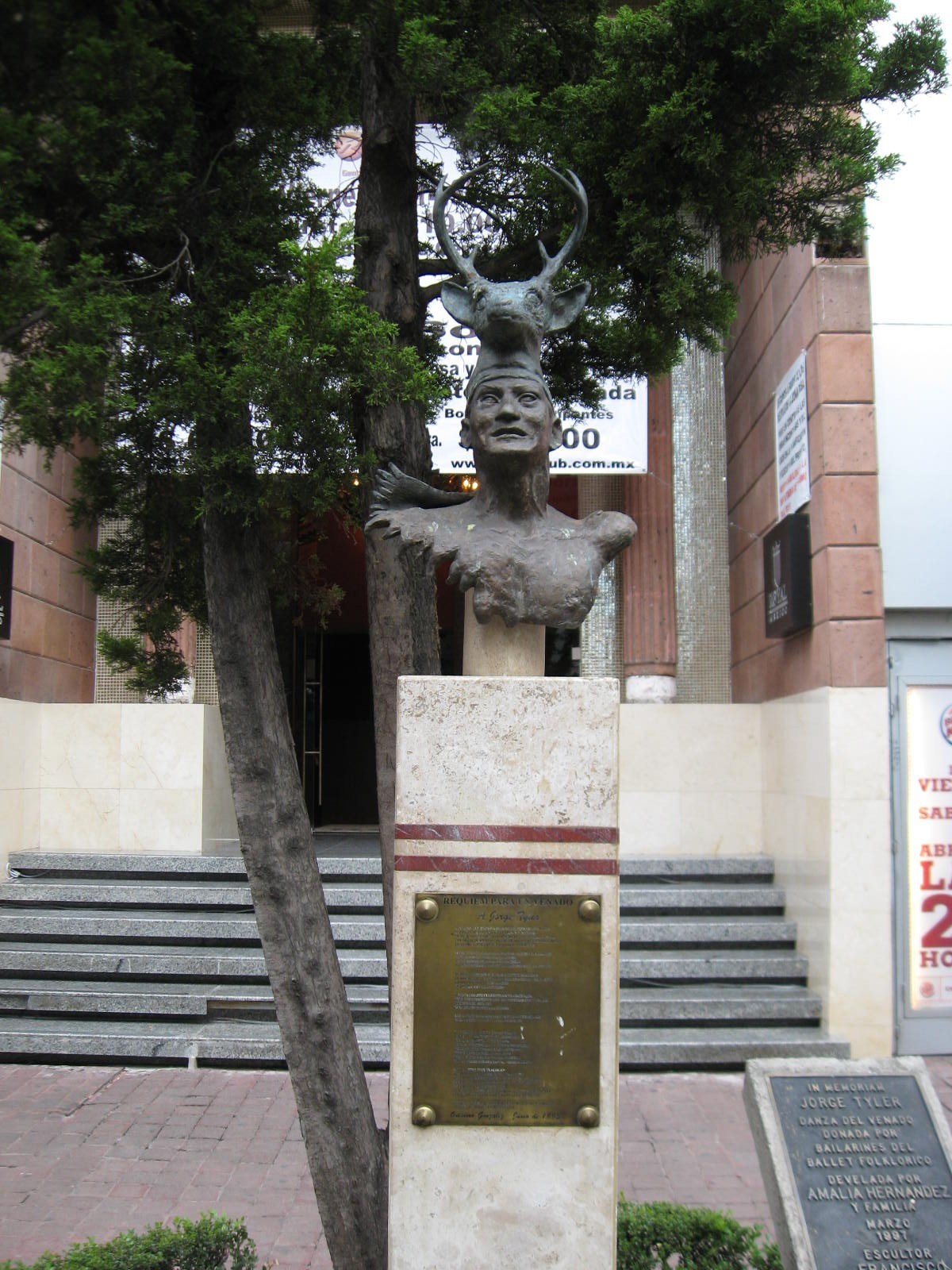
Sculpture in memory of deer dancer Jorge Tyler on display on Genova Street in the "Zona Rosa" in Mexico City.

Yaqui music is the music of the Yaqui tribe and people of Arizona and Sonora. Their most famous music are the deer songs (Yaqui: maso bwikam) which accompany the deer dance. They are often noted for their mixture of Native American and Catholic religious thought.

Their deer song rituals resemble those of other Uto-Aztecan groups (Yaqui is an Uto-Aztecan language) though is more central to their culture. Native and Spanish instruments are used including the harp, violin or fiddle, rasp (hirukiam, also kuta), drum, and rattles. Singing forms include the deer songs as well as messenger songs (suru bwikam), corn wine songs (vachi vino bwikam), fly songs (nahi bwikam), and coyote songs (wo'i bwikam).

The first recordings of Yaqui music, including thirteen deer songs, were made by Frances Densmore in 1922.

A display at the Arizona State Museum depicts the deer dance and provides a rendition of a deer song. Because the melody spans a modest range, it is ideally suited to instruments that have a limited pitch range, and has been transcribed for the Native American flute.

The deer dance, usually held all night, thanks and honors the deer, little brother (maso, little brother deer: saila maso), for coming from its home, the flower world (seyewailo), and letting itself be killed so that people may live. Deer dancers, pahkolam (ritual clowns), wear rattles around their ankles made from butterfly cocoons, honoring the insect world, and rattles from the hooves of deer around their waist, honoring the many deer who have died. The dance is also accompanied by singing and instruments including water drum (representing the deer's heartbeat) and frame drum, rasp (representing the deer's breathing), gourd rattles held by the dancers (honoring the plant world), as well as the flute, fiddle, and frame harp. The pahkolam dance, give sermons, host (providing water, etc.), joke, and put on comedic skits, such as pretending to be coyotes.

The deer singers (masobwikamem) sing lyrics describing things from nature and which may be seen by the deer. The song lyrics use a way of talking which differs slightly from casual Yaqui and resembles Yaqui elders' speech in some ways, for example syllable repetition (reduplication) such as the use of yeyewe rather than yewe ("play"), or substituting /l/ for another phoneme. Deer songs also contain important terms, such as seyewailo, which may be considered archaic. Fairly conventionalized, deer songs consist of two sections, comparable to stanzas, the first (u vat weeme) and the concluding (u tonua) parts: "the first part is sung many times and then the concluding part will fall down there." The conclusion often uses antithesis.

== See also ==
- Deer dance (folk dance)
