= Kitakami Michinoku Traditional Dance Festival =

Summer festival in Iwate, Japan

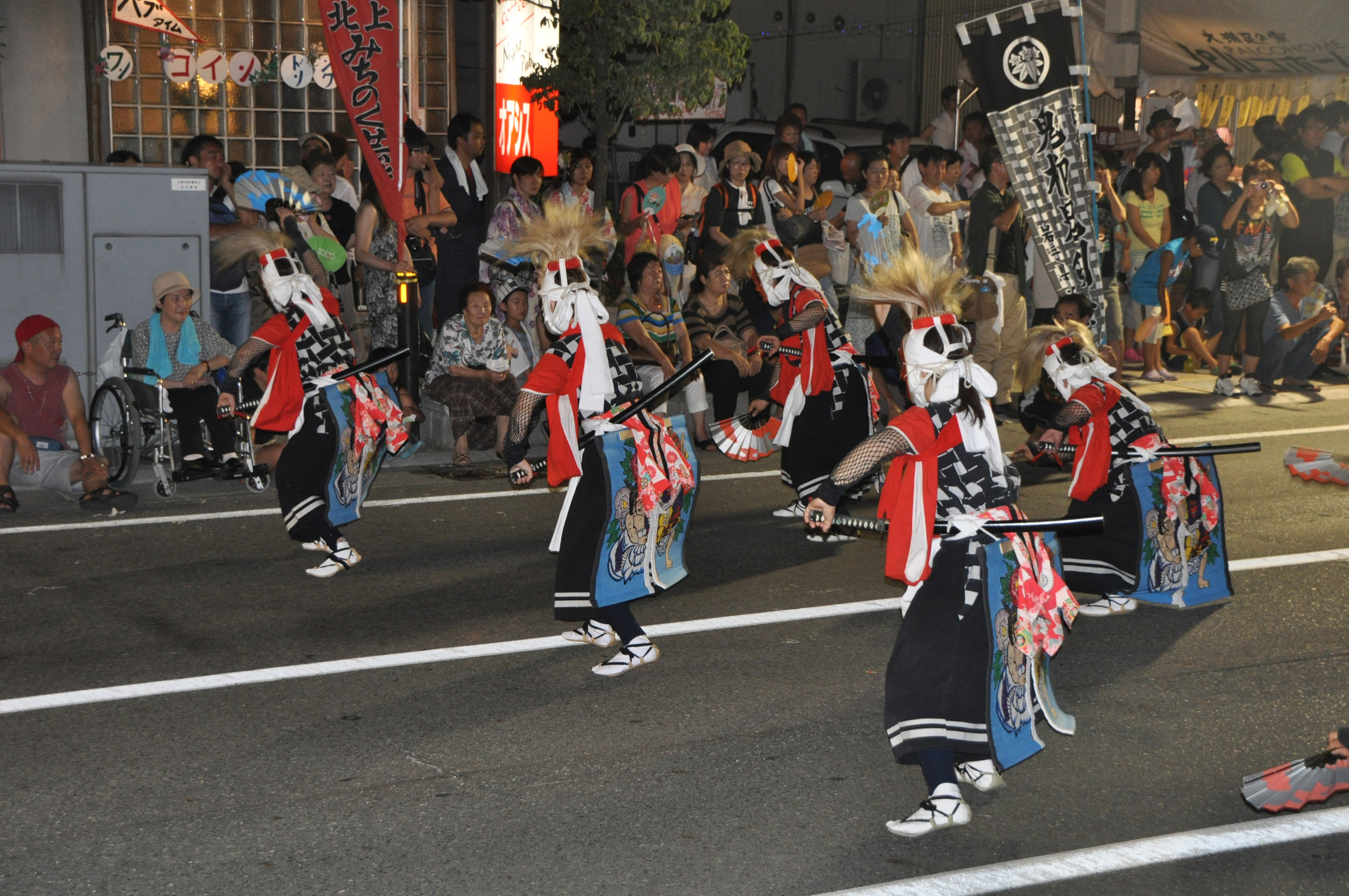
Devils Sword Dance of Kitakami, Iwate, performed on the street in the Kitakami Michinoku Traditional Dance Festival

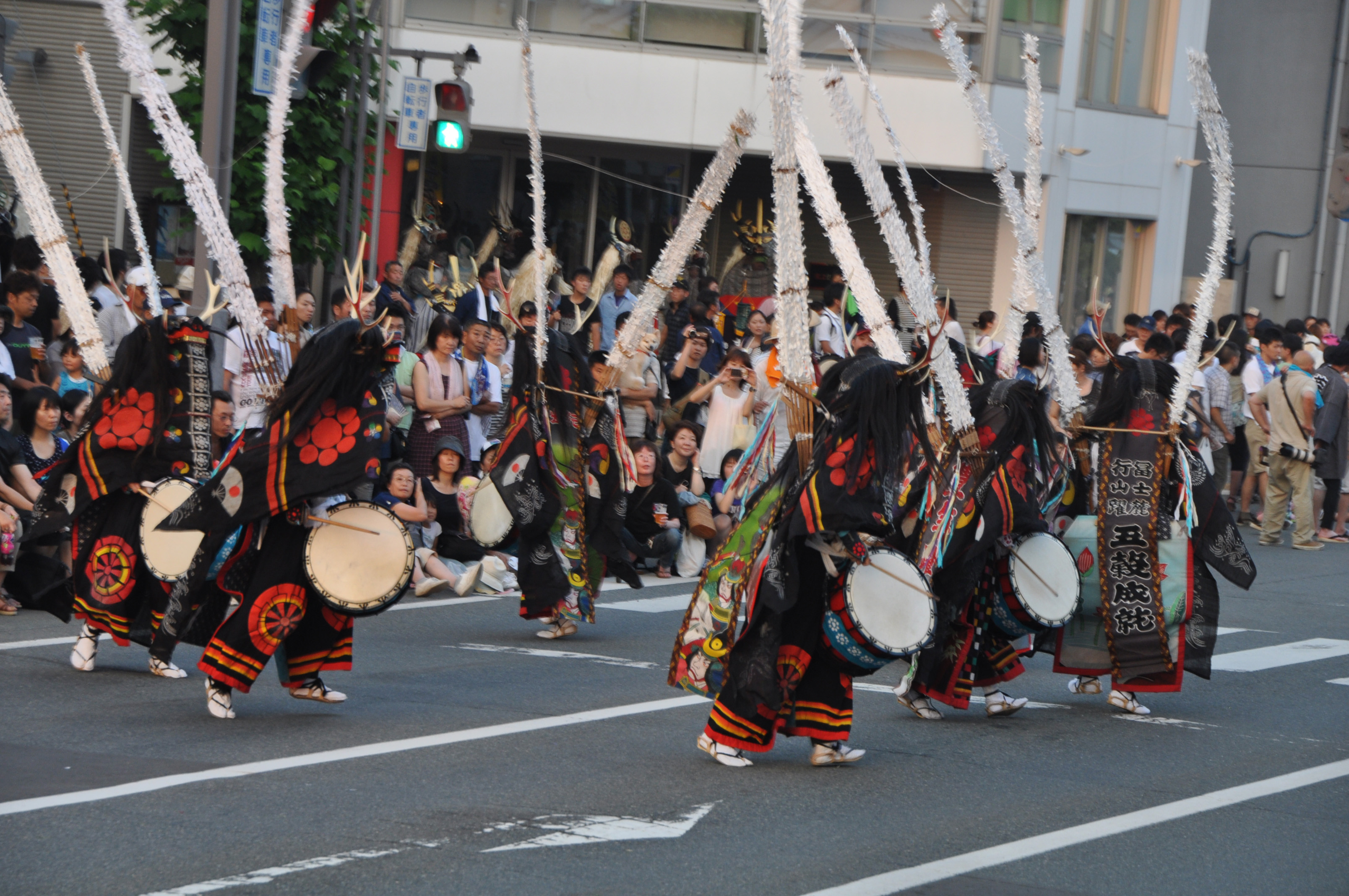
Deer dance of Oshu, Iwate

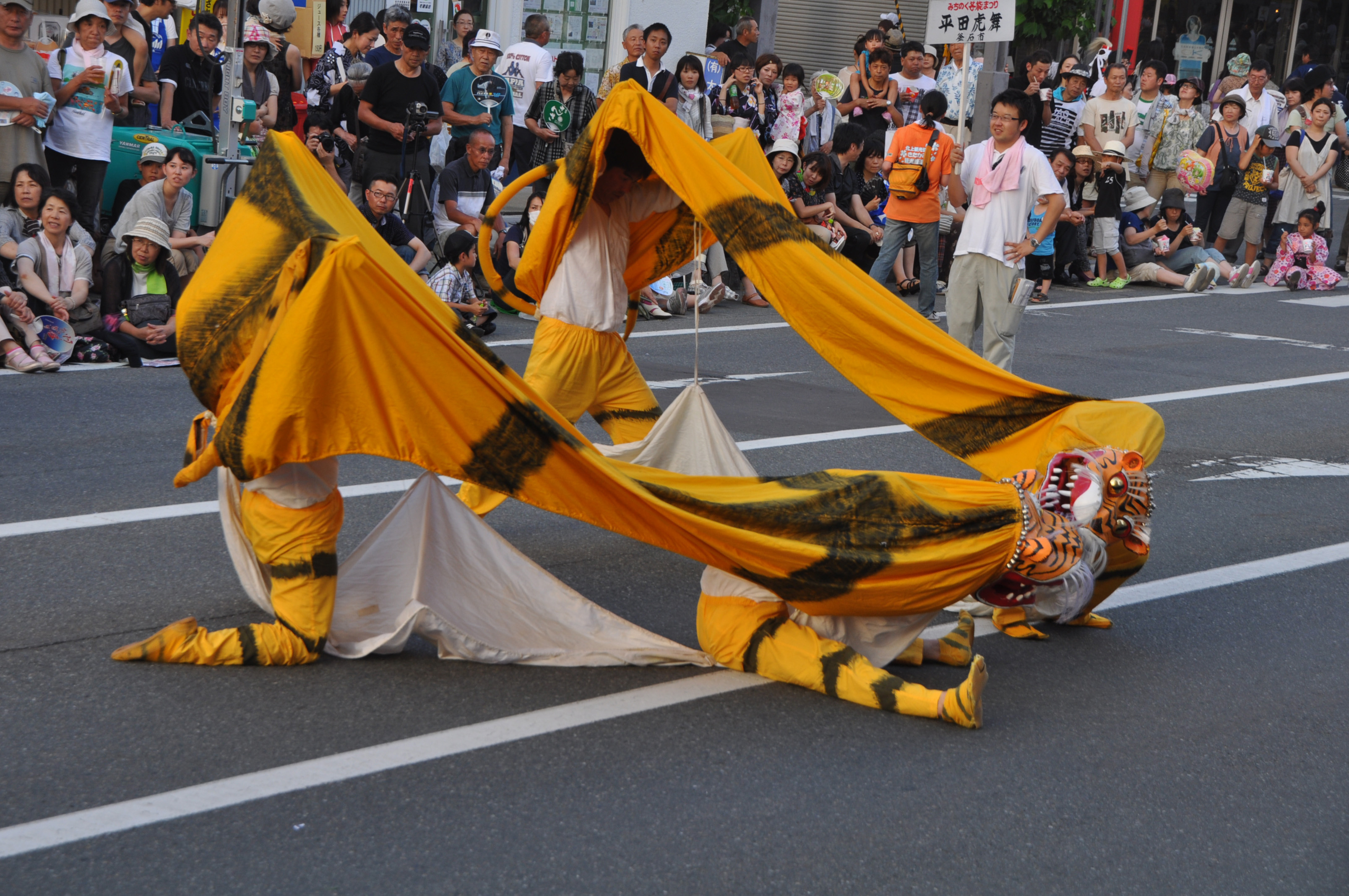
Tiger dance of Kamaishi, Iwate

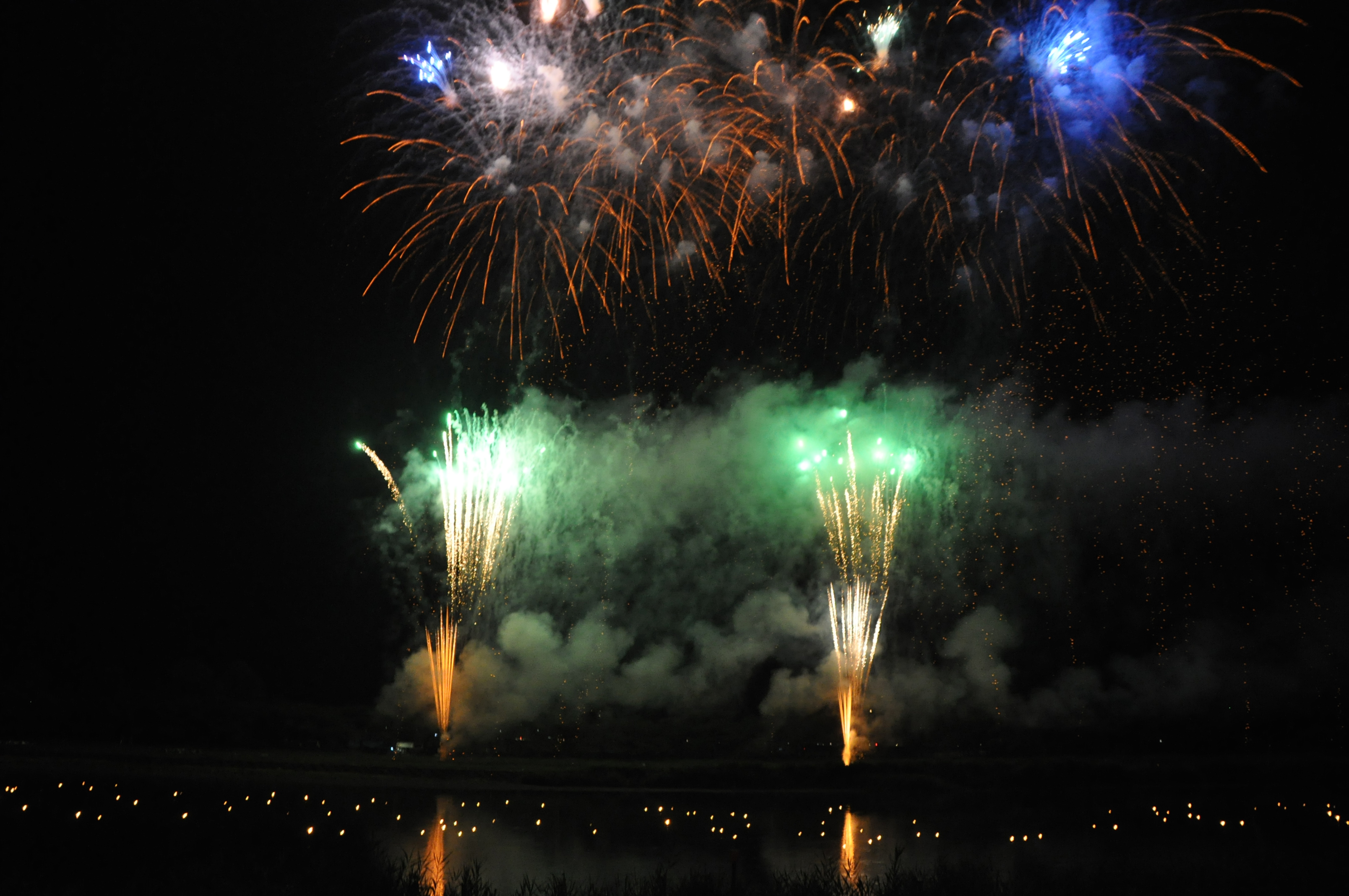
Fireworks display over the Kitakami River, as the small lanterns float down the river

Kitakami Michinoku Traditional Dance Festival (Japanese: 北上・みちのく芸能まつり) is a summer festival held in Kitakami, Iwate, Japan, where Devils Sword (鬼剣舞), Deer (鹿踊), Tiger and other traditional dances of Michinoku, Japan's northeast region, are performed. A recent program of this festival included: Bon dance on the first day, the parade of the traditional dances on the second, and the Fireworks display over the Kitakami River on the third day.

== See also ==
- Festivals of Japan
- List of festivals in Japan
