= Tiger dance =

Traditional performing art

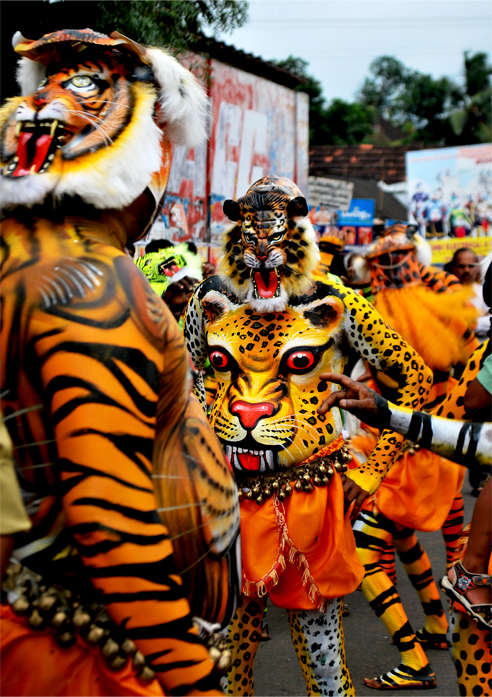
Puli Kali of Kerala, India

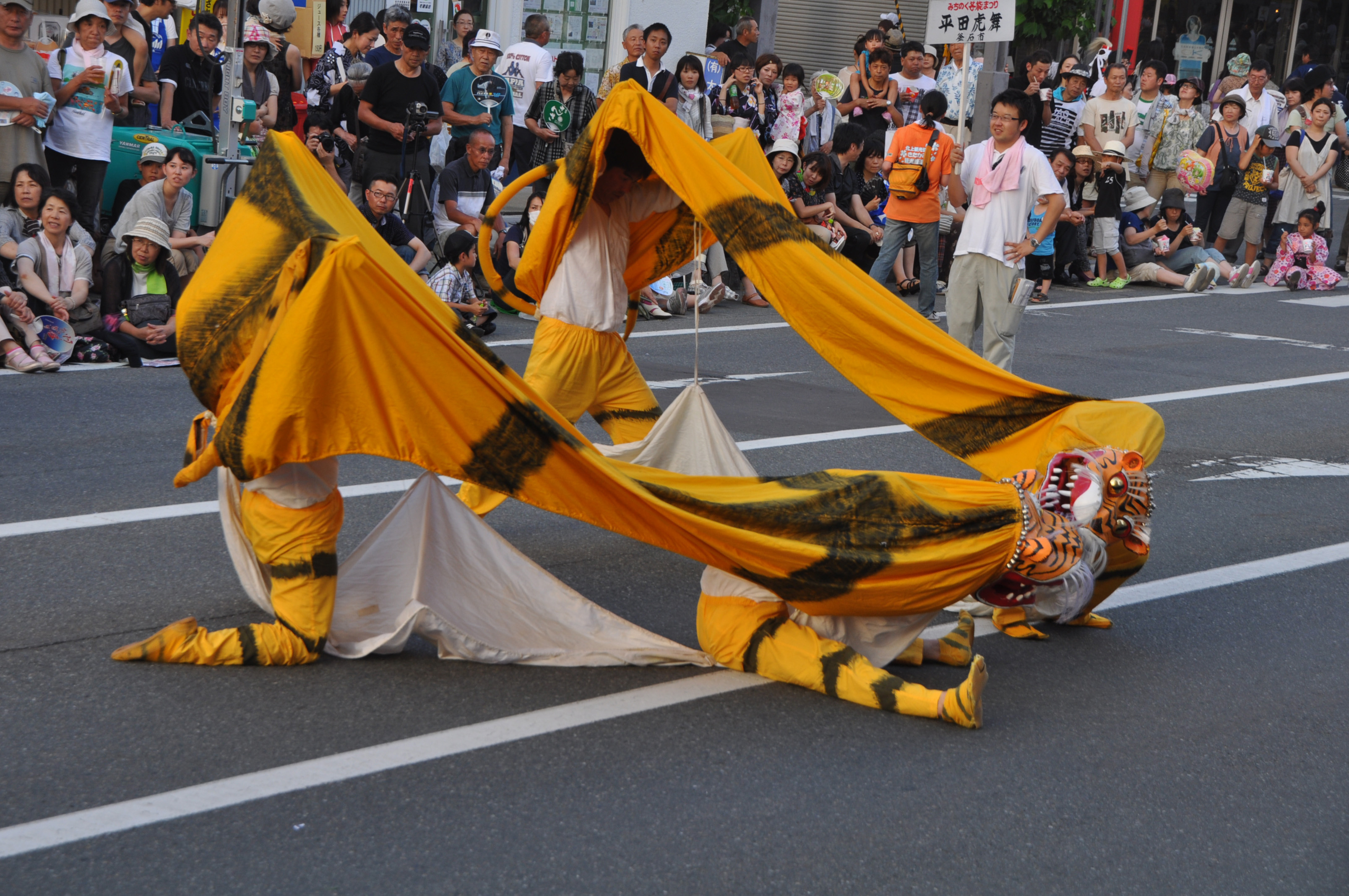
Tiger dance of Kamaishi, Iwate, performed on the street in Kitakami Michinoku Traditional Dance Festival, Kitakami, Iwate

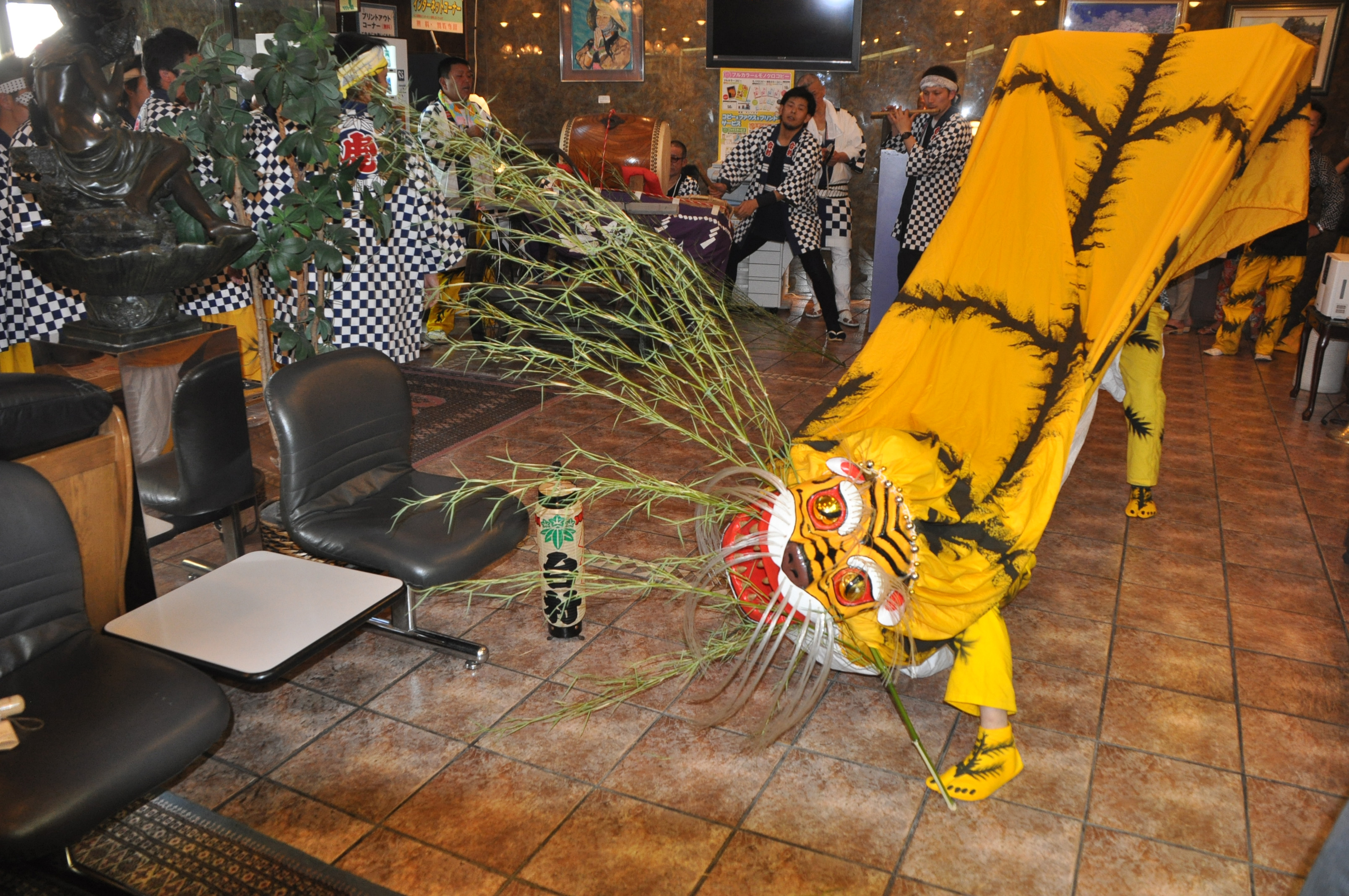
Tiger dance of Kamaishi, Iwate, performed in the lobby of a hotel, Kitakami, Iwate

Tiger dance is a traditional performing art in which persons wearing tiger costumes dance by themselves or with others.

== Asia ==
=== Indonesia ===
- Reog Ponorogo of Ponorogo, Java

=== India ===
- Puliyattam - Tamil Nadu
- Pilivesa | Huli Vesha - Tulu Nadu region spanning the Indian states of Karnataka and Kerala.
- Puli Kali - Kerala
- Baagh Naach - Subarnapur district, Ganjam district, Odisha
- Manavi Vagh (Human Tiger) - Nagpur, Maharashtra

=== Nepal ===
- Baagh Naach of Newa People of Nepal

=== China ===
- Tiger dance of Hainan
- Tiger dance of Henan
- Tiger dance of Lo Wu, Northern District, Hong Kong
- Tiger dance of Yongji, Shanxi

=== Japan ===
- Tiger dance of Kamaishi, Iwate
- Tiger dance of Ōfunato, Iwate
- Tiger dance of Shizuoka prefecture
- Tiger dance of Yokosuka, Kanagawa

=== Thailand ===
- Tiger dance of Bangkok
- Tiger dance of Lampang
- Tiger dance of Nakhon Sawan

=== Vietnam ===
- Tiger dance of Huế

== See also ==
- Lion dance
- Sagaan Ubgen, who performs the tiger dance in Buddhist cham
