= Human tiger =

Human tiger is a famous and now-dying folk dance tradition of Nagpur. This was in vogue till 1974–75. This involved skin painting of strong statured men with tiger-like colours and dance of these men in open during various festivals like Ganpati festival and Moharram.

== See also ==
- Nagpur
