= Lion dance =

Traditional Chinese dance

- A lion dance competition in Dallas, Texas.

Chinese name
- Traditional Chinese: 舞獅
- Simplified Chinese: 舞狮
Transcriptions
Standard Mandarin
- Hanyu Pinyin: wǔshī
Yue: Cantonese
- Jyutping: mou5si1

Alternative Chinese name
- Traditional Chinese: 跳獅 or 弄獅
Transcriptions
Southern Min
- Hokkien POJ: thiàu-sai or lāng-sai

Vietnamese name
- Vietnamese alphabet: múa lân, múa sư tử
- Chữ Nôm: 𢱖麟

Korean name
- Hangul: 사자춤
- Hanja: 獅子춤
Transcriptions
- Revised Romanization: sajachum
- McCune–Reischauer: sajach'um

Japanese name
- Kanji: 獅子舞
Transcriptions
- Romanization: shishimai

Indonesian name
- Indonesian: barongsai

Lion dance (traditional Chinese: 舞獅; simplified Chinese: 舞狮; pinyin: wǔshī) is a form of traditional dance in Chinese culture and other Asian countries in which performers mimic a lion's movements in a lion costume to bring good luck and fortune and to ward off evil. The lion dance is usually performed during the Lunar New Year and other traditional, cultural and religious festivals. It may also be performed at important occasions such as business opening events, special celebrations or wedding ceremonies, or may be used to honor special guests by the Chinese communities.

The Chinese lion dance is normally performed by two dancers, one of whom manipulates the head while the other manipulates the tail of the lion. It is distinguishable from the dragon dance which is performed by many people who hold the long sinuous body of the dragon on poles. Some fundamental movements of the lion dance can be found in Chinese martial arts, and it is commonly performed to a vigorous drumbeat with gongs and cymbals.

There are many forms of lion dance in China, but two main forms of the lion dance are the Northern Lion and the Southern Lion. Around the world, especially in Southeast Asia, the Southern Lion predominates as it was spread by Chinese diaspora communities who are historically mostly of Southern Chinese origin. Versions of lion dance related to the Chinese lion are also found in Japan, South Korea, Taiwan, and Vietnam. Besides the Chinese-based lion dance, other forms of lion dance also exist in India, Indonesia, and East Africa.

== History ==
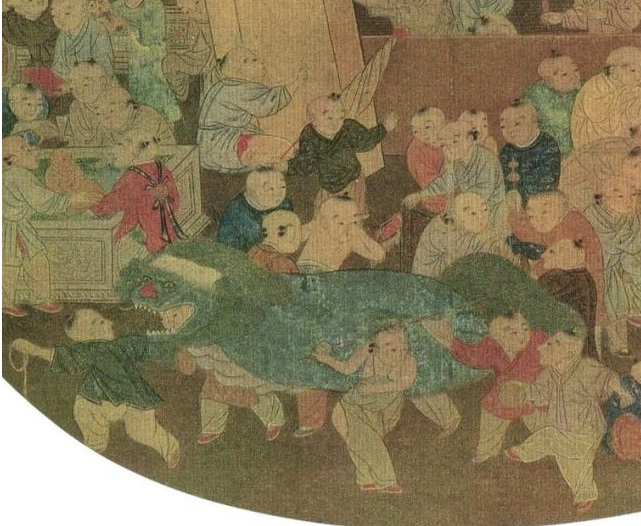
Details of the Song dynasty painting "One Hundred Children Playing in the Spring" (百子嬉春图页) by Su Hanchen showing children performing the Lion dance

There has been an old tradition in China of dancers wearing masks to resemble animals or mythical beasts since antiquity, and performances described in ancient texts such as Shujing in which wild beasts and phoenixes danced may have been masked dances. In Qin dynasty sources, dancers performing exorcism rituals were described as wearing bearskin masks, and it was also mentioned in Han dynasty texts that "mime people" (象人) performed as fish, dragons, and phoenixes.

However, the lion is not native to China (a species found in Northeast China, Panthera youngi, had long become extinct), and the lion dance therefore has been suggested to have originated outside of China from countries such as India or Persia, and introduced via Central Asia. According to ethnomusicologist Laurence Picken, the Chinese word for lion itself, shi (獅, written as 師 in the early periods), may have been derived from the Persian word šer. The earliest use of the word shizi to mean "lion" was in Han dynasty texts and had strong associations with Central Asia (an even earlier but obsolete term for lion was suanni (狻麑 or 狻猊), and lions were presented to the Han court by emissaries from Central Asia and the Parthian Empire.

Detailed descriptions of lion dance appeared during the Tang dynasty and it was already recognized by writers and poets then as a foreign dance. However, lion dance may have been recorded in China as early as the third century AD where "lion acts" were referred to by a Three Kingdoms scholar Meng Kang in a commentary on Hanshu. In the early periods, it was associated with Buddhism: it was recorded in a Northern Wei text, Description of Buddhist Temples in Luoyang (洛陽伽藍記), that a parade for a statue of Buddha of a temple was led by a lion to drive away evil spirits. An alternative suggestion is therefore that the dance may have developed from a local Chinese tradition that appropriated the Buddhist symbolism of lion.

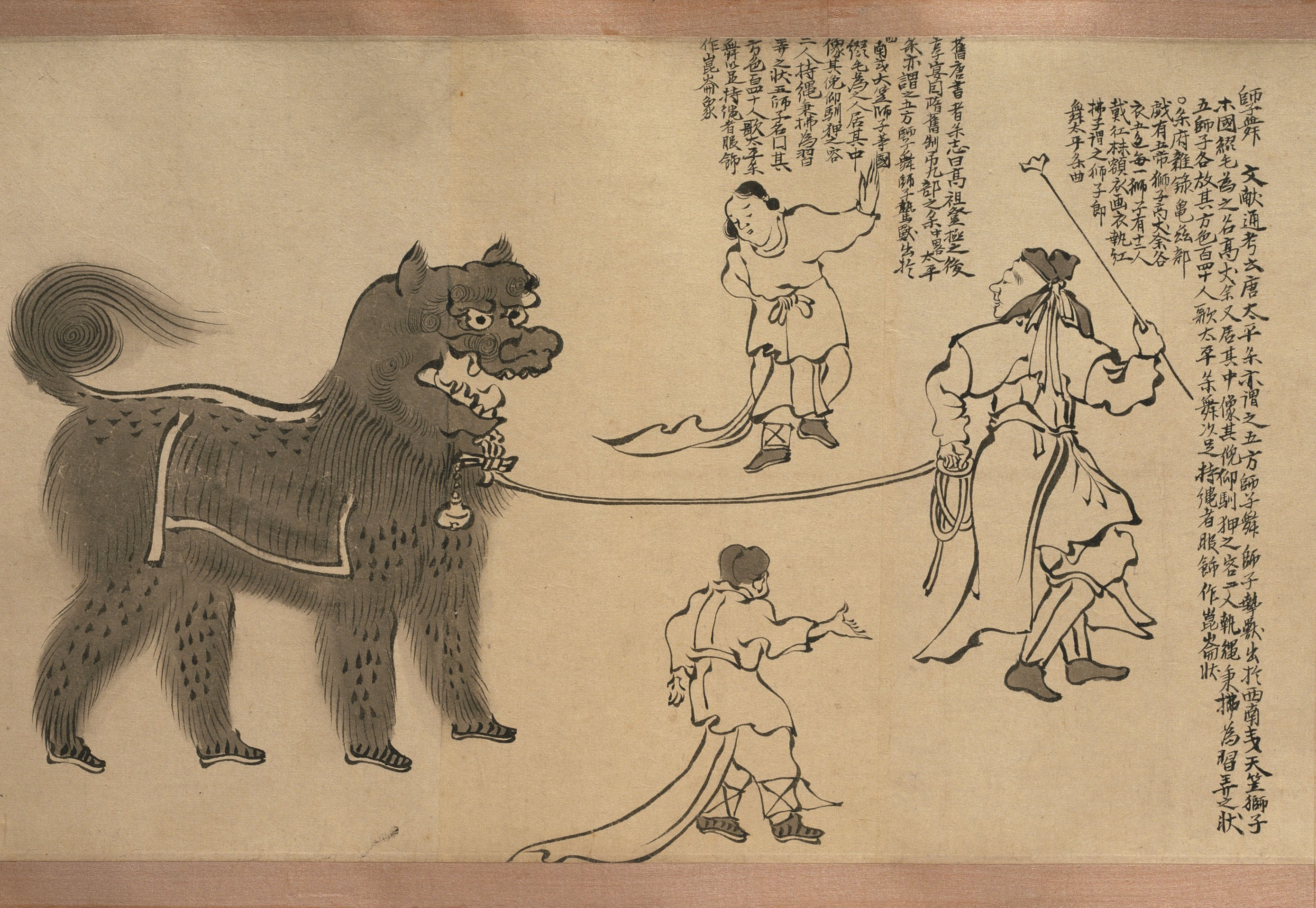
Japanese illustration of a lion dance that some argue represents the Tang dynasty lion dance described by Bai Juyi. The original drawing is dated to the Heian period.

There were different versions of the dance in the Tang dynasty. In the Tang court, the lion dance was called the "Great Peace Music" (太平樂, Taiping yue) or the "Lion dance of the Five Directions" (五方師子舞) where five large lions of different colours and expressing different moods were each led and manipulated on rope by two persons, and accompanied by 140 singers. In another account, the 5 lions were described as each over 3 metres tall and each had 12 "lion lads", who may tease the lions with red whisks. Another version of the lion dance was described by the Tang poet Bai Juyi in his poem "Western Liang Arts" (西凉伎), where the dance was performed by two hu (胡, meaning here non-Han people from Central Asia) dancers who wore a lion costume made of a wooden head, a silk tail and furry body, with eyes gilded with gold and teeth plated with silver as well as ears that moved, a form that resembles today's lion dance. By the eighth century, this lion dance had reached Japan. During the Song dynasty the lion dance was commonly performed in festivals and it was known as the Northern Lion during the Southern Song.

The Southern Lion is a later development in the south of China originating in the Guangdong province. There are a number of myths associated with the origin of the Southern Lion: one story relates that the dance originated as a celebration in a village where a mythical monster called Nian was successfully driven away; another has it that the Qianlong Emperor dreamt of an auspicious animal while on a tour of Southern China, and ordered that the image of the animal be recreated and used during festivals. However it is likely that the Southern Lion of Guangzhou is an adaptation of the Northern Lion to local myths and characteristics, perhaps during the Ming dynasty.

== Chinese styles ==
The two main types of lion dance in China are the Northern and Southern Lions. There are however also a number of local forms of lion dance in different regions of China, and some of these lions may have significant differences in appearance, for example the Green or Hokkien Lion (青獅, Qing Shi) and the Taiwanese or Yutien Lion (明獅, Ming Shi), popular with the Hokkien and the Taiwanese people.

Other ethnic minority groups in China also have their own lion dances: for example, the lion dance of the Muslim minority in Shenqiu County in Henan called the Wen Lion, the lion dance in Yongdeng County, Gansu, and others. There are other related forms of dances with mask figures that represent mythical creatures such as the Qilin and the Pixiu. The Qilin dance and the Pixiu dance are most commonly performed by the Hakka people who were originally from Central China, but have largely settled in the south of China and southeast Asia in modern times.

Chinese lion dances usually involve two dancers but may also be performed by one. The larger lions manipulated by two persons may be referred to as great lions (太獅), and those manipulated by one person little lions (少獅). The performances may also be broadly divided into civil (文獅) and martial (武獅) styles. The civil style emphasizes the character and behaviour of the lion, while the martial style is focused on acrobatics and energetic movements. Various forms of lion dance are also widely found in East Asian countries such as Japan, Korea, Vietnam, as well as in communities in the Himalayas region.

=== Northern Lion ===
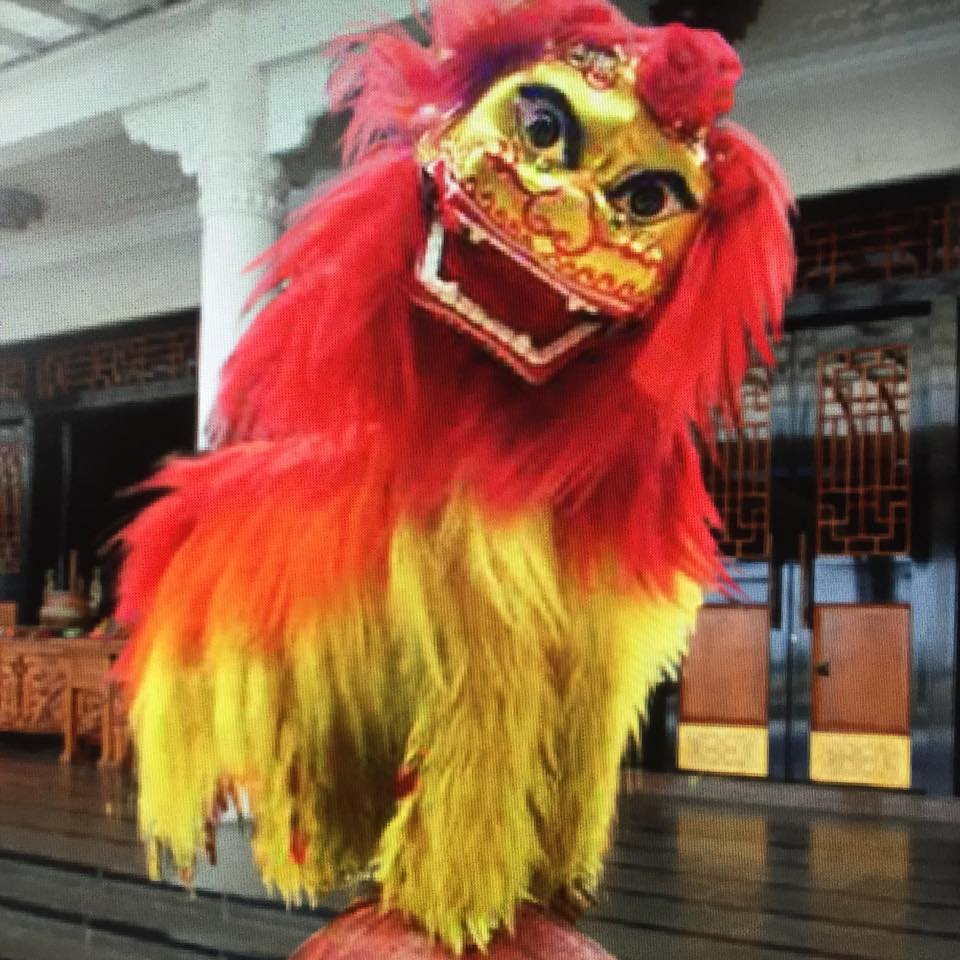
A Northern Lion dance

The Chinese Northern Lion (simplified Chinese: 北狮; traditional Chinese: 北獅; pinyin: Běi shī) dance is often performed as a pair of male and female lions in the north of China. Northern lions may have a gold-painted wooden head and shaggy red and yellow hair with a red bow on its head to indicate a male lion, or a green bow (sometimes green hair) to represent a female. There are however regional variations of the lion. Regions with lion dance troupes include Ninghai in Ningbo, Xushui in Hebei province, Dalian in Liaoning province, and Beijing. There are a number of variations of the lion dance performance, for example the Heavenly Tower Lion dance (simplified Chinese: 天塔狮舞; traditional Chinese: 天塔獅舞; pinyin: Tiān tǎ shī wǔ) from Xiangfen County in Shanxi is a performance whereby a number of lions climb up a tall tower structure constructed out of wooden stools, and there are also high-wire acts involving lions.

It is said that the Northern Lion may have originated from Northern Wei, when Hu dancers performed the dance for the emperor, and it was referred to as Northern Lion by the Song dynasty. Northern lions resemble Pekingese or Foo Dogs/Fu Dogs, and their movements are lifelike during a performance. Acrobatics is very common, with stunts like lifts, or balancing on a tiered platform or on a giant ball. Northern lions sometimes appear as a family, with two large "adult" lions and a pair of small "young" lions. There are usually two performers in one adult lion, and one in the young lion. There may also be a "warrior" character who holds a spherical object and leads the lions.

=== Southern Lion ===
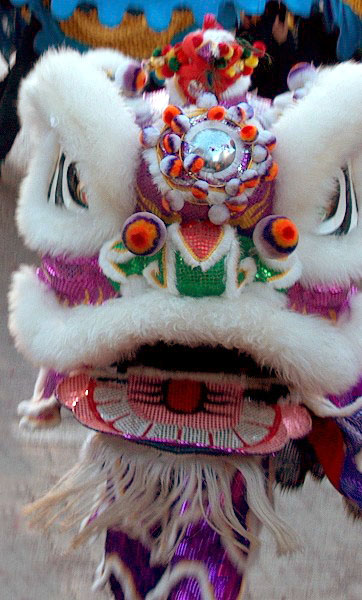
A Southern Fut San style lion

The Chinese Southern Lion (simplified Chinese: 南狮; traditional Chinese: 南獅; pinyin: Nán shī) or Cantonese Lion dance originated from Guangdong and is the best known lion outside of China. The Southern lion has a single horn, and is associated with the legend of a mythical monster called Nian. The lion's head is traditionally constructed using papier-mâché over a bamboo frame covered with gauze, then painted and decorated with fur. Its body is made of durable layered cloth also trimmed with fur. Newer lions, however, may be made with modern materials such as aluminium instead of bamboo and are lighter. Newer versions may also apply shinier modern material over the traditional lacquer such as sequins or laser stickers.

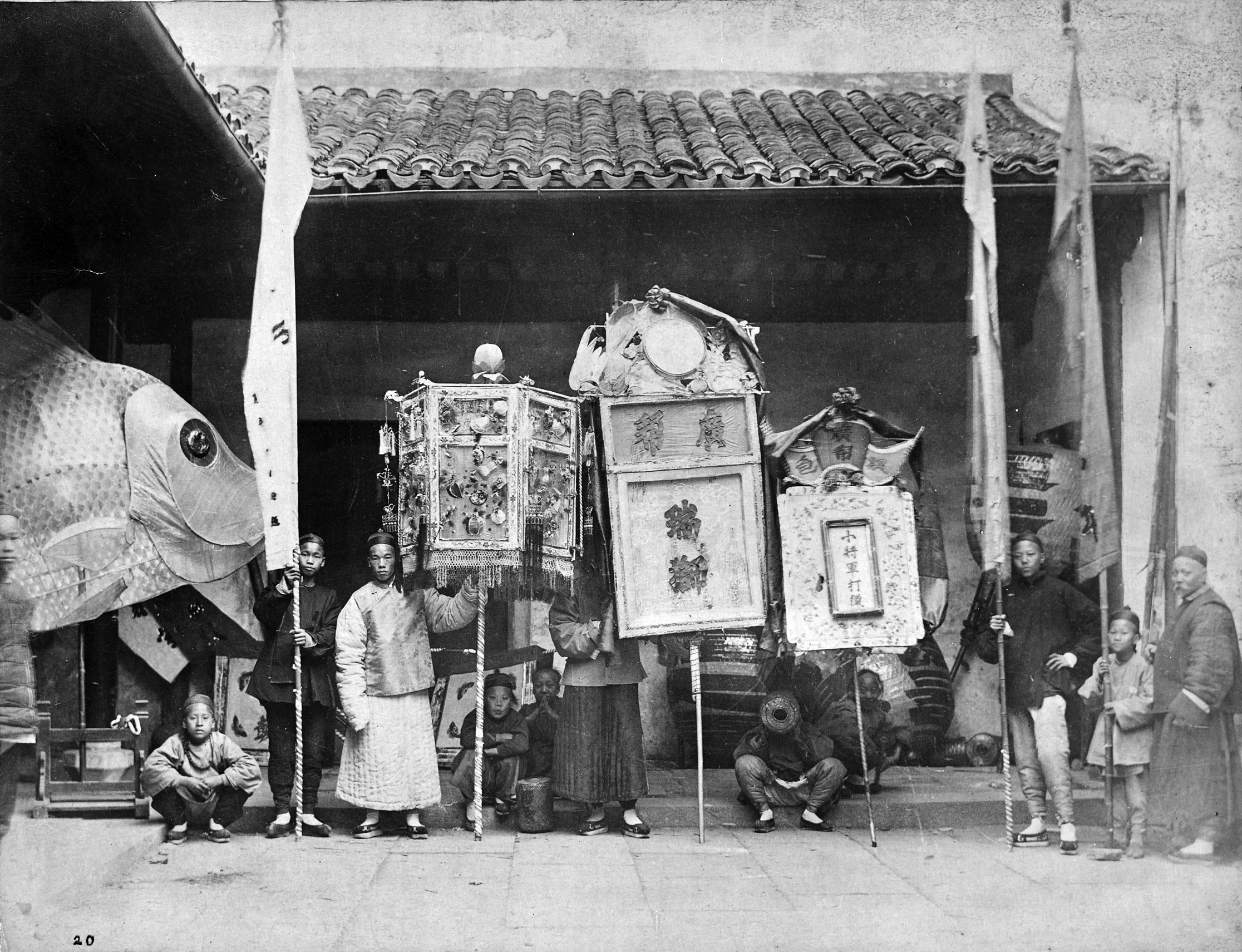
Cantonese Lion dance troupe holding a rui shi (瑞獅; "auspicious lion") sign in the late 19th century

There are two main styles of Southern Lion: the Fut San or Fo Shan (Chinese: 佛山; pinyin: Fóshān; lit. 'Buddha Mountain'), and the Hok San or He Shan (simplified Chinese: 鹤山; traditional Chinese: 鶴山; pinyin: Hèshān; lit. 'Crane Mountain'), both named after their place of origin. Other styles include the Fut-Hok (a hybrid of Fut San and Hok San created in Singapore by Kong Chow Wui Koon in the 1960s), and the Jow Ga (performed by practitioners of Jow family style kung fu). The different lion types can be identified from the design of the lion head.

==== Fut San (Fo Shan) style ====
Fo Shan is the style adopted by many kung fu schools. It uses kung fu moves and postures to help with its movements and stances, and only the most advanced students are allowed to perform. Traditionally, the Fo Shan lion has bristles instead of fur, and is heavier than the modern ones now popularly used. All traditional Fo Shan lions have pop-up teeth, tongue, and eyes that swivel left and right. On the back are gold-foiled rims and a gilded collar where the troupe's name may be sewn on. It has a very long tail with a white underside, and is often attached with bells. The designs of the tail are also more square and contain a diamond pattern going down the back. It has a high forehead, curved lips and a sharp horn on its head. Traditional Fo Shan lions are ornate in appearance, but a number of regional styles have developed around the world. The newer styles of Fo Shan lions replace all the bristles with fur and the tails are shorter. The eyes are fixed in place, and the tongue and teeth do not pop up. The tail is curvier in design, does not have a diamond pattern, and lacks bells.

==== Hok San (He Shan) style ====
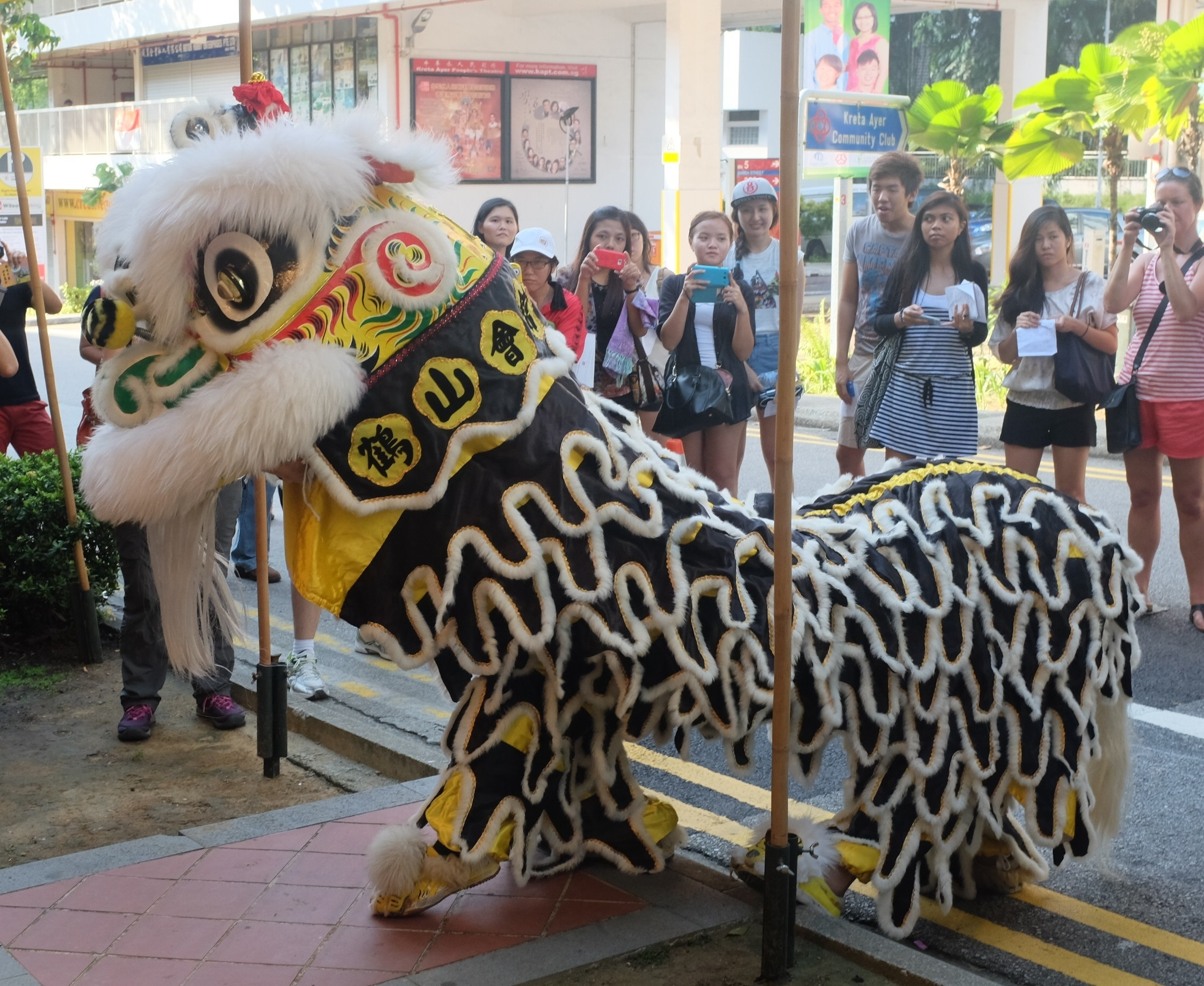
Lion dance by the Hok San Association in Singapore

The Hok San (traditional Chinese: 鶴山; simplified Chinese: 鹤山; pinyin: Hèshān; lit. 'Crane Mountain') style was founded by Feng Gengzhang, (traditional Chinese: 馮庚長; simplified Chinese: 冯庚长; pinyin: Féng Gēngzhǎng). Born in a village in Heshan County, Guangdong, Feng was originally trained in the Fut San style. He aimed to refine his lion dance techniques to more closely resemble the natural movements of a real animal—particularly a cat. To support this vision, he redesigned key features of the lion head, including the mouth, lips, and eyes, to create a more graceful, expressive, and elegant appearance. Specific drum patterns were also developed to better synchronize with the lion's movements.

The Hok San style was introduced to Singapore in the 1920s by Li Yi Sheng (Chinese: 李怡生), a disciple of Feng. He played a key role in founding the Singapore Hok San Association Lion Dance Troupe (Chinese: 新加坡鶴山會館武術醒獅團). The style gained popularity in Singapore and saw widespread adoption across Malaysia and beyond.

=== Green Lion ===
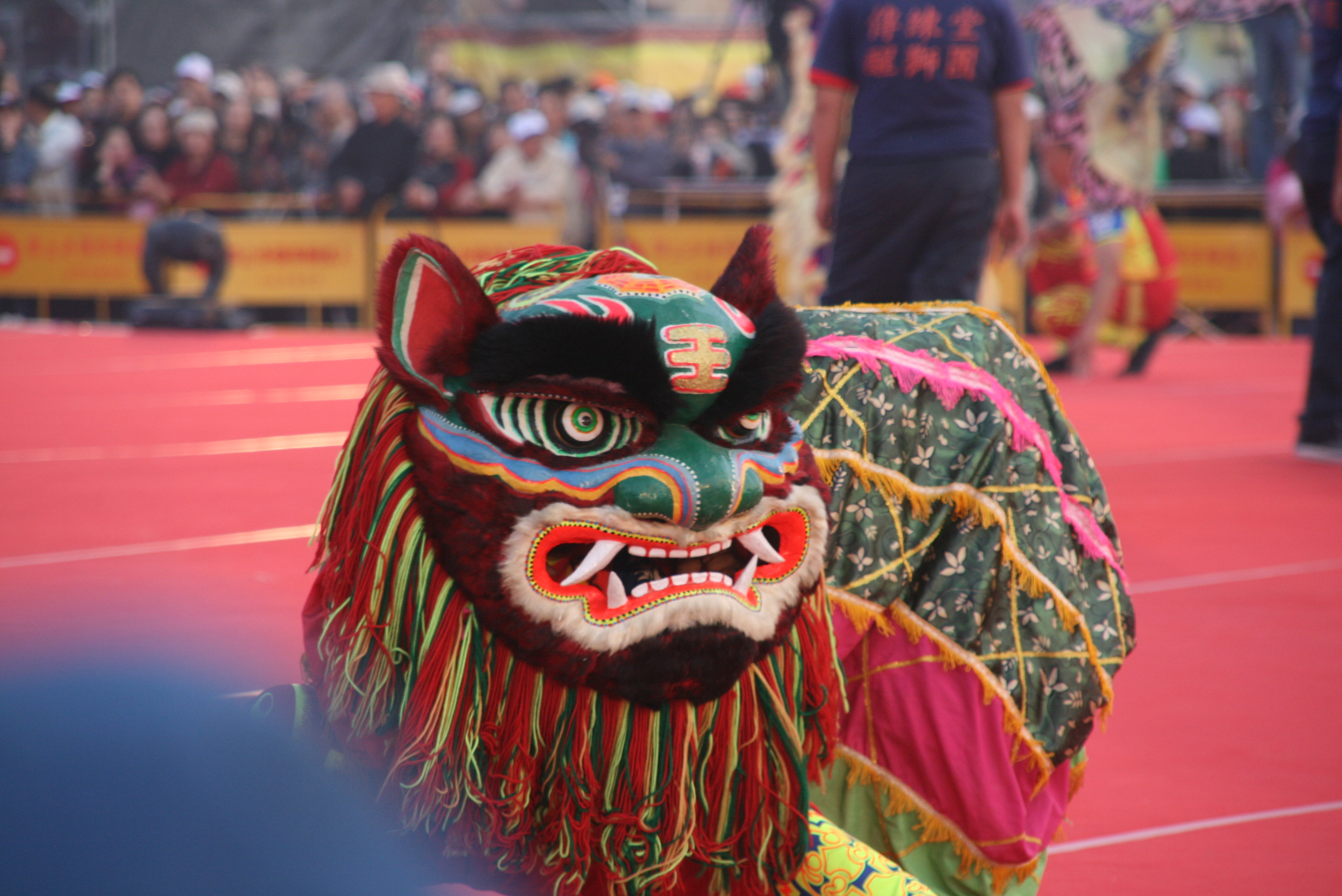
Green Lion performance in Taiwan

Green Lion (青狮) is the lion dance form associated with the Hokkien-speaking people of Fujian and Taiwan. It is similar to the Chinese Southern Lion dance, except that the lion is mainly green in color and has a distinct round flat mask. It is believed to have originated in the anti-Manchu movements after the fall of the Ming dynasty in 1644. The word "green lion" in the Hokkien language sounds similar to "Qing army" (清师). During training sessions for fighters, the Green Lion was fitted with blades symbolizing the Manchurian army and would become a moving target for trainees. It is said that after the fall of Qing dynasty in 1912, martial arts expert Gan De Yuan (干德源) organized a performance in Quanzhou where the Green Lion was dismembered to represent the overthrow of the Qing dynasty. From that point onwards, the Green Lion has been used without the blades and is performed for cultural and ritual purposes.

== Other styles ==
=== Vietnam ===
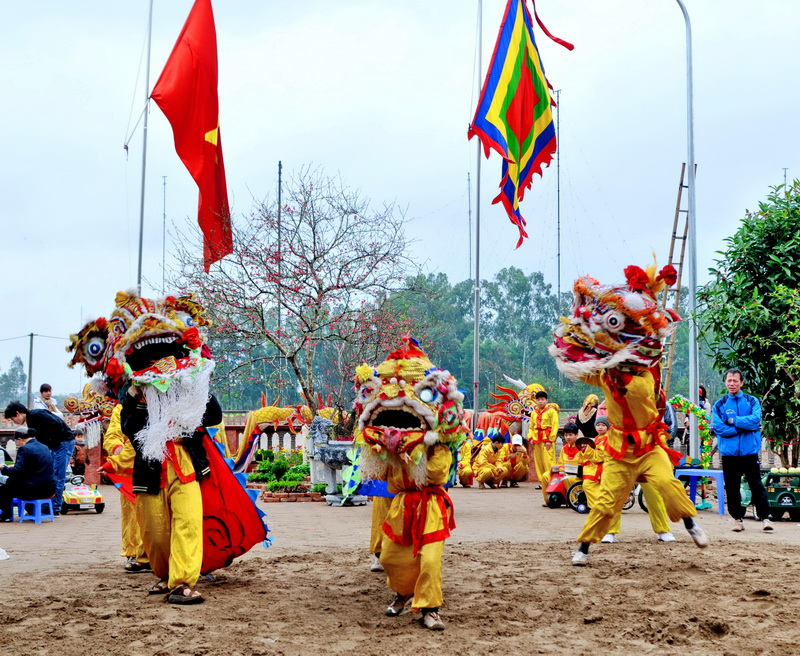
Lion dance at the Triều Khúc village festival in Hanoi

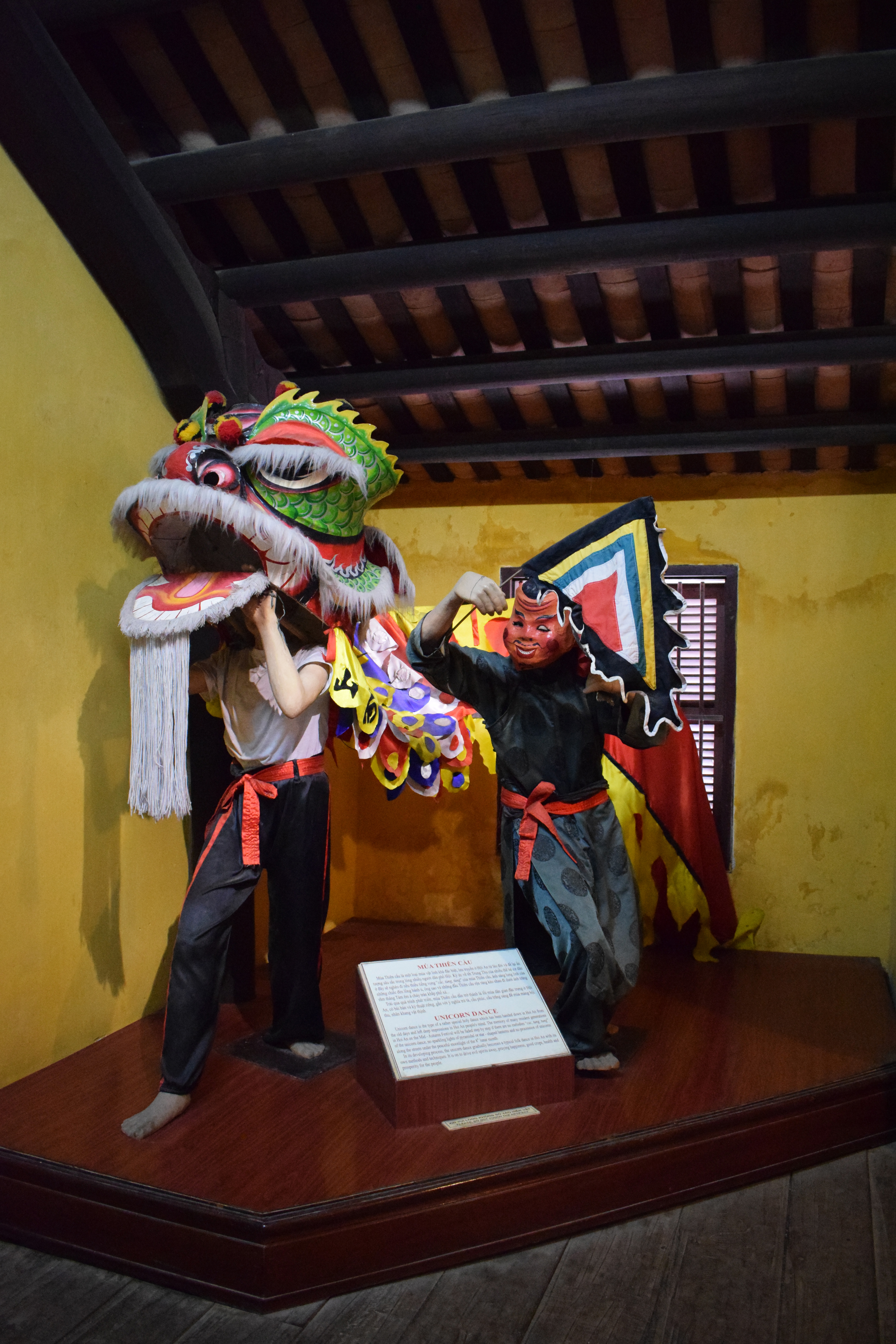
Lion dance model in a museum in Hoian

In Vietnamese, the term "múa sư tử" refers to the northern style of Chinese lion dance, while "múa lân" is commonly used for the southern style.

The word "lân" originates from "kỳ lân" (qilin), making "múa lân" a general term for the arts. It is believed that various types of lion dance were introduced to Vietnam over time by Chinese traders and migrants, and were gradually adapted into Vietnamese cultural practices.

There are distinct local forms that differ in appearance and performance, for example, the lion dances of the Tày and Nùng minority people. A court version of the dance is performed at the Duyet Thi Duong Theatre within the grounds of the royal palace in Huế.

=== Japan ===
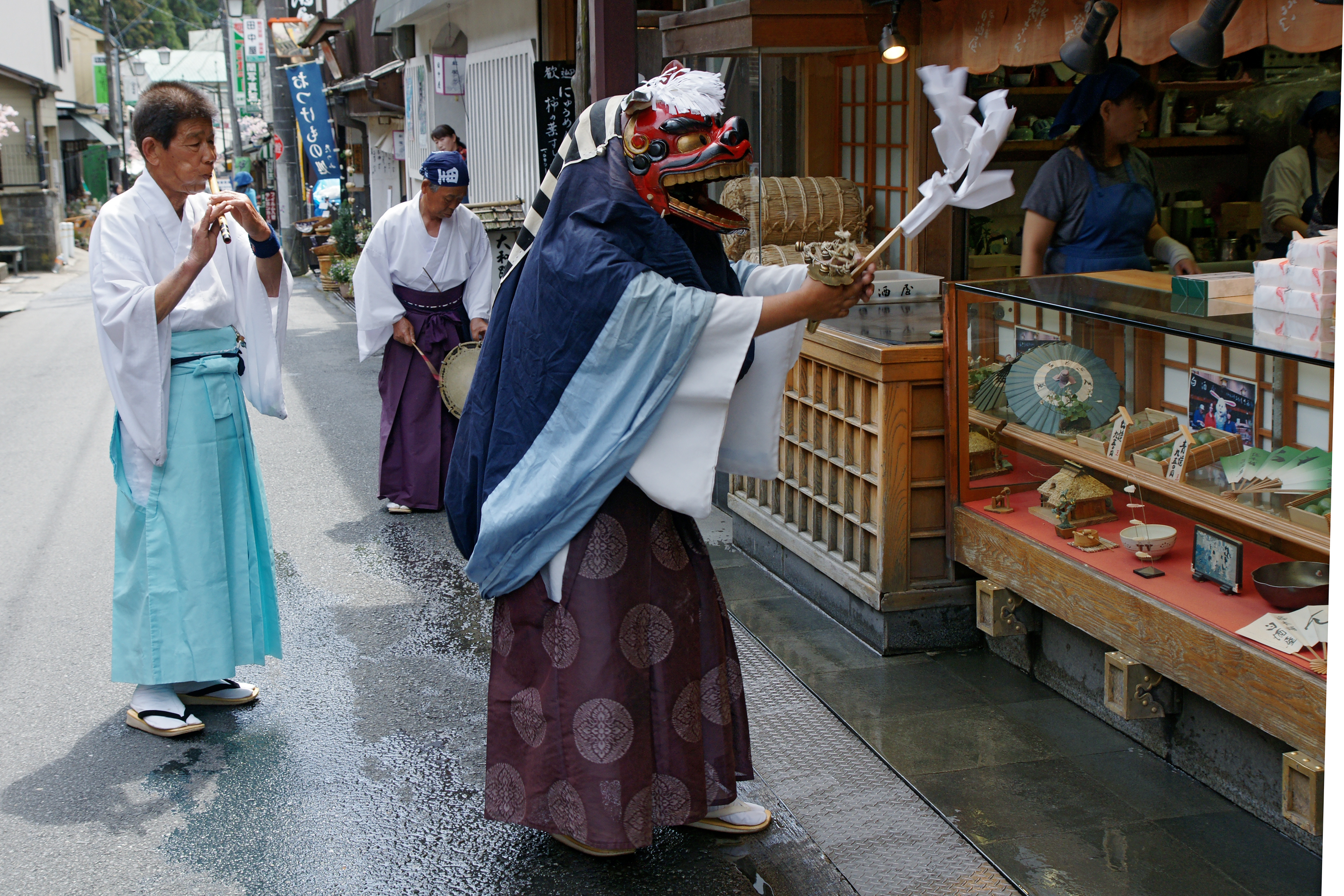
A Japanese lion dance performed in Sakurai, Nara, by a single person accompanied by flute and drum musicians

Japan has a long tradition of the lion dance, known as shishi-mai (獅子舞) in Japanese. The dance, believed to have originated in India, may have been introduced to Japan via China and Korea as part of the masked drama-dance gigaku during the Asuka period. It became associated with the celebration of Buddha's Birthday. The first lion dance recorded in Japan was at the inauguration ceremonies of Tōdai-ji in Nara in 752. The oldest surviving lion mask, made of paulownia wood with an articulated lower jaw, is also preserved in Tōdai-ji. The dance is commonly performed during the New Year to bring good luck and drive away evil spirits, and the lion dancers may be accompanied by flute and drum musicians. It is also performed at other festivals and celebrations. In some of these performances, the lions may bite people on the head to bring good luck.

Shishi-mai dance at a summer festival in Hachiōji, 2015

The lion dance has been absorbed into Japanese tradition. There are many different lion dances in Japan and the style of dancing and design of the lion may differ by region – it is believed that as many as 9,000 variations of the dance exist in the country. The lion dance is also used in religious Shinto festivals as part of a performing art form called kagura. Shishi kagura may be found in different forms – for example the daikagura which is mainly acrobatic, the yamabushi kagura, a type of theatrical performance done by yamabushi, practitioners of Shugendō, and also in bangaku and others. Various forms of shishi dances are also found in noh, kabuki (where the lion dances form a group of plays termed shakkyōmono, examples include Renjishi), and bunraku theatres.

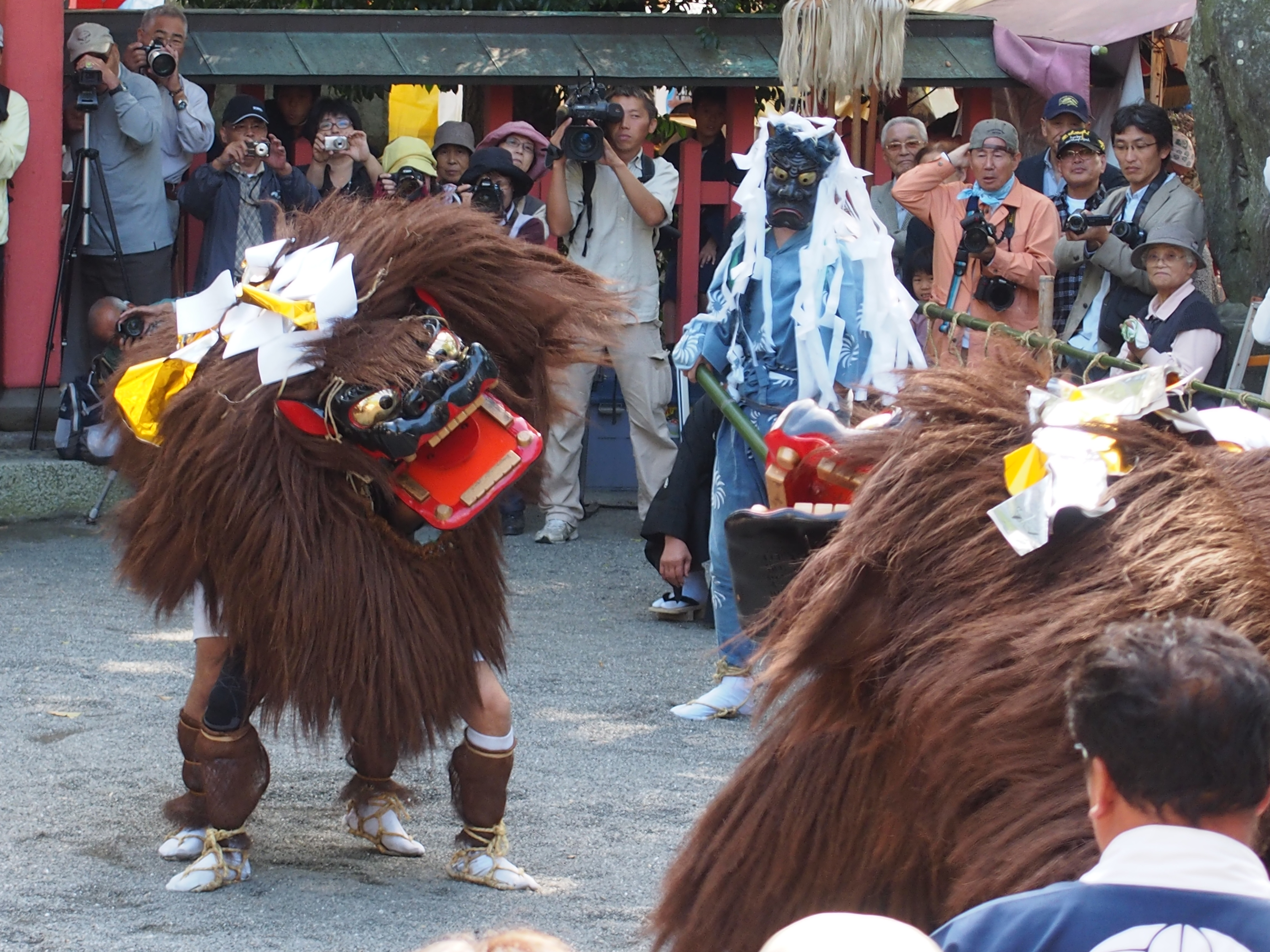
Lion dance of Minagi shrine in Asakura, Fukuoka

The Japanese lion usually consists of a wooden, lacquered head called a shishi-gashira (lit. 'lion head'), often with a characteristic body of green dyed cloth with white designs. It can be manipulated by a single person, or by two or more persons, one of whom manipulates the head. The one-man variety is most often seen in eastern Japan. As with Chinese lions, the make of the head and designs on the body will differ from region to region, and even from school to school. The mask however may sometimes have horns appearing to be a deer (shika), and shishi written with different kanji characters can mean beast, deer, or wild boar, for example as in shishi-odori (鹿踊, lit. 'deer dance'). Historically, the word shishi may refer to any wild four-legged animal, and some of these dances with different beasts may therefore also be referred to as shishi-mai. The dance may also sometimes feature tigers (tora) or qilin (kirin).

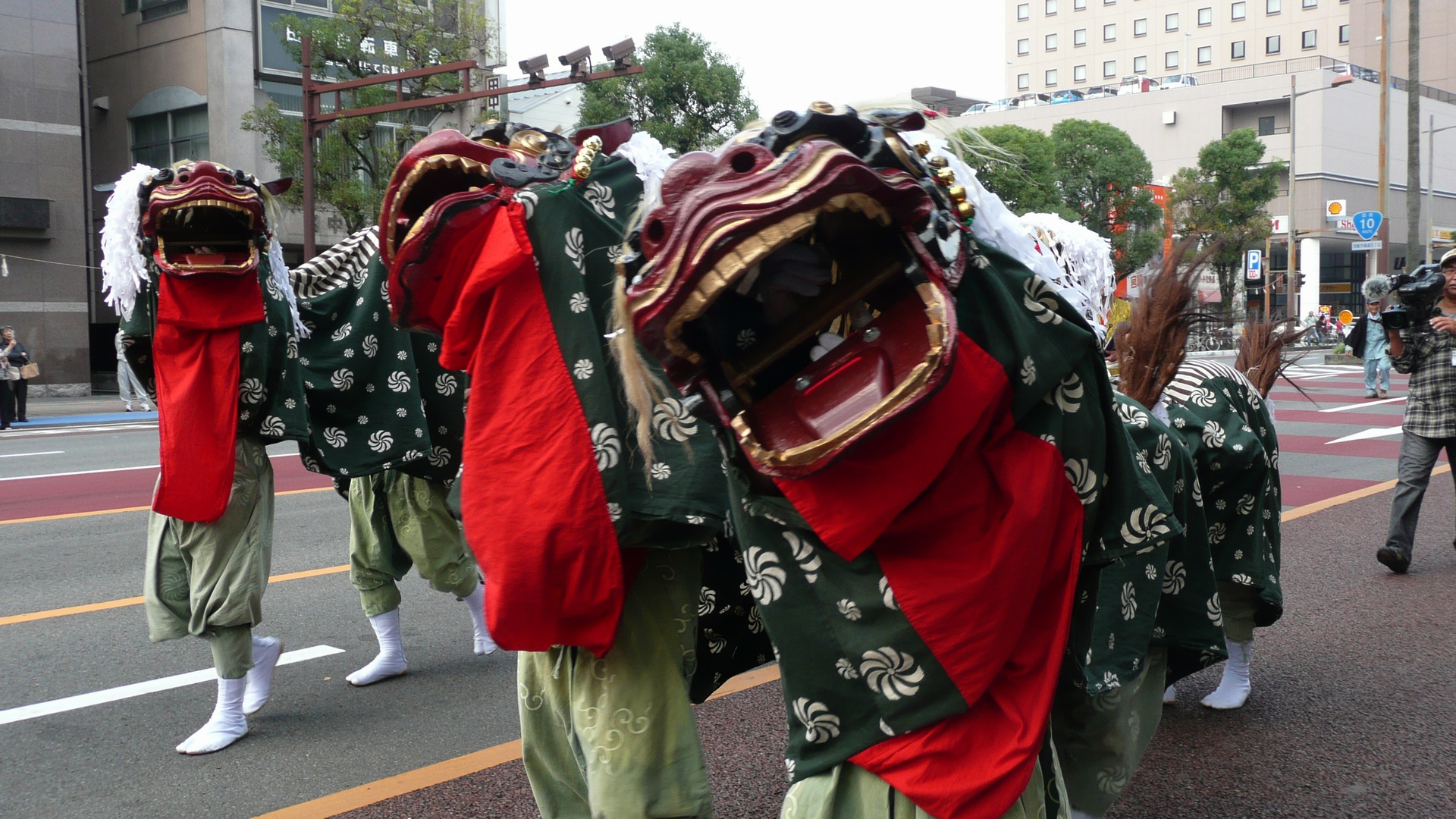
Festival of Miyazaki Shrine, Japan

In Okinawa, a similar dance exists, though the lion there is considered to be a legendary shisa. The heads, bodies, and behavior of the shisa in the dance are quite different from the shishi on mainland Japan. Instead of dancing to the sounds of flutes and drums, the Okinawan shisa dance is often performed to folk songs played with the sanshin.

=== Korea ===
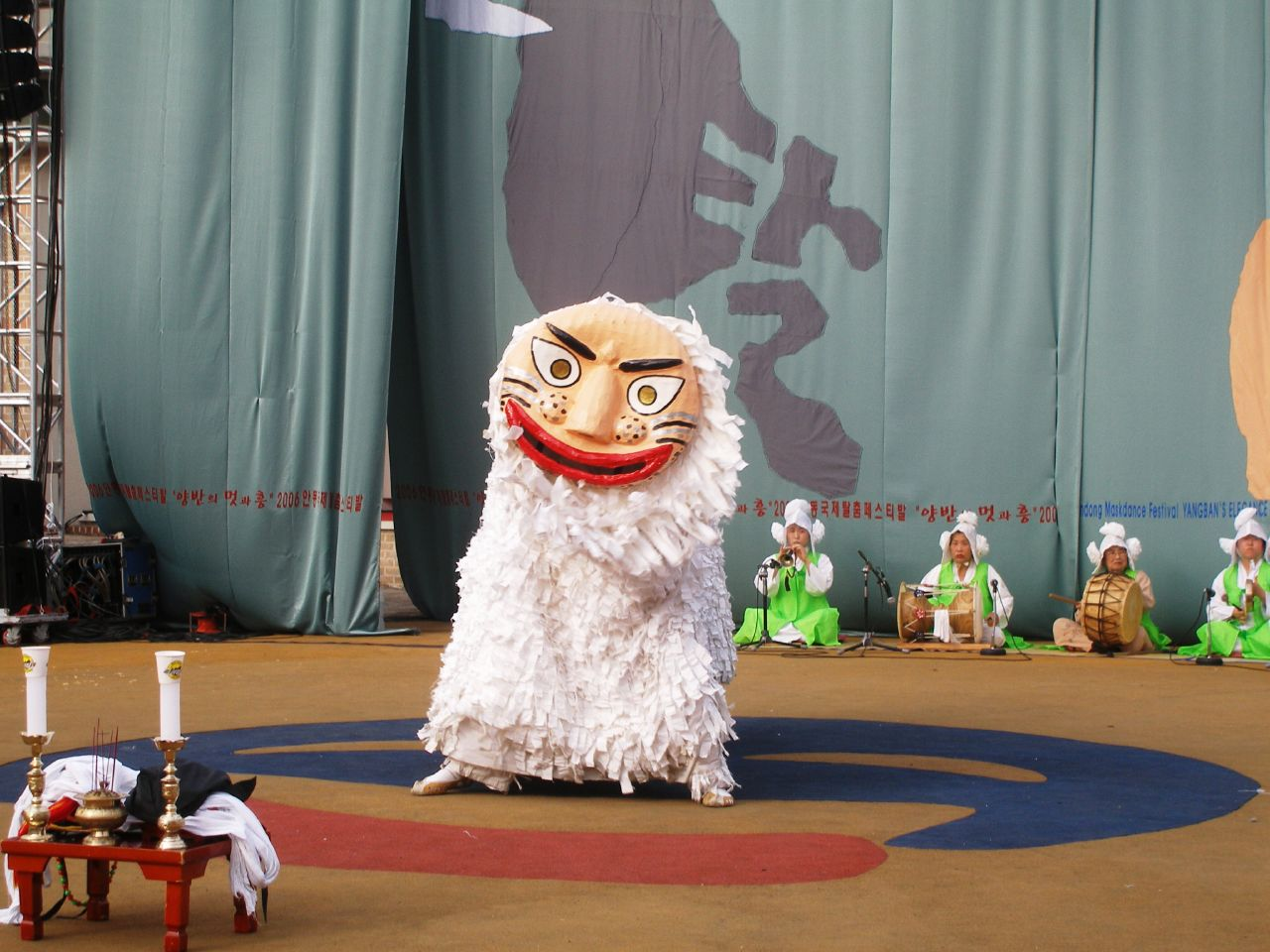
Korean lion dance from Eunyul talchum

Lion dance was recorded as "sanye" (狻猊, the old word for lion) in the Korean historical work Samguk Sagi, one of the five poems on the dances of the Silla kingdom written by Ch'oe Ch'i-wŏn. It may have been recorded as early as King Jinheung's reign in the 6th century, during which a tune titled "The Lion's Talent" was composed that could be a reference to a lion dance. Two main traditions of lion dance survive in Korea: the saja-noreum, which is performed as an exorcism drama, and the sajach'um performed in association with masked dramas. In many of the traditional masked dance dramas, the lion dance appears as one part of a number of acts. Examples of these dramas are Ŭnyul t'alch'um, Pongsan t'alch'um (봉산탈춤), Suyong Yayu (수영야류), and T'ongyong Ogwangdae (통영오광대). There was also once a court version of the lion dance.

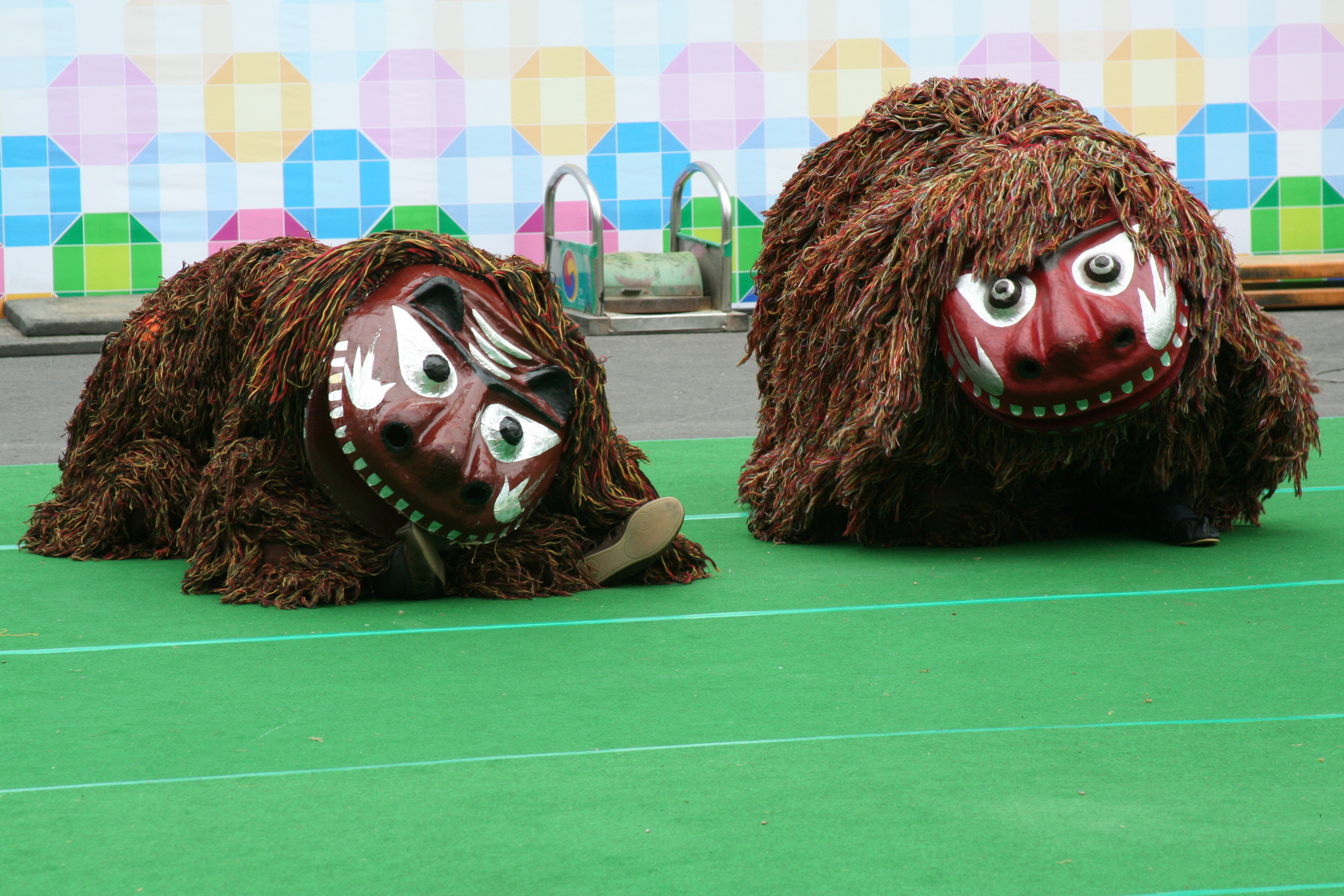
Lions of Bukcheong sajanoreum

Lion dance as an exorcism ritual began to be performed in the New Year in Korea during the Goryeo dynasty. The best known of the Korean saja-noreum lion dances is the Bukcheong sajanoreum or lion mask play from Bukcheong. In this lion dance, the lion with a large but comic lion mask and brown costume may be performed together with performers wearing other masks. The dancers may be accompanied by musicians playing a double-headed drum, an hourglass-shaped drum, a large gong, and a six-holed bamboo flute. The dance was originally performed every night of the first fifteen nights of the Lunar New Year, where the dance troupe in lion masks and costumes visited every house in the villages of the Bukcheong region to expel evil spirits and attract good luck for the coming year. The eyes of the lion mask may be painted gold to expel negative spirits. The lion masks of Pongsan and Gangnyeong may feature rolling eyes and bells meant to frighten demons when they make a sound as the lion moves. It is also believed that children who sat on the back of the lion during such performances would enjoy good health and a long life.

=== Tibet ===
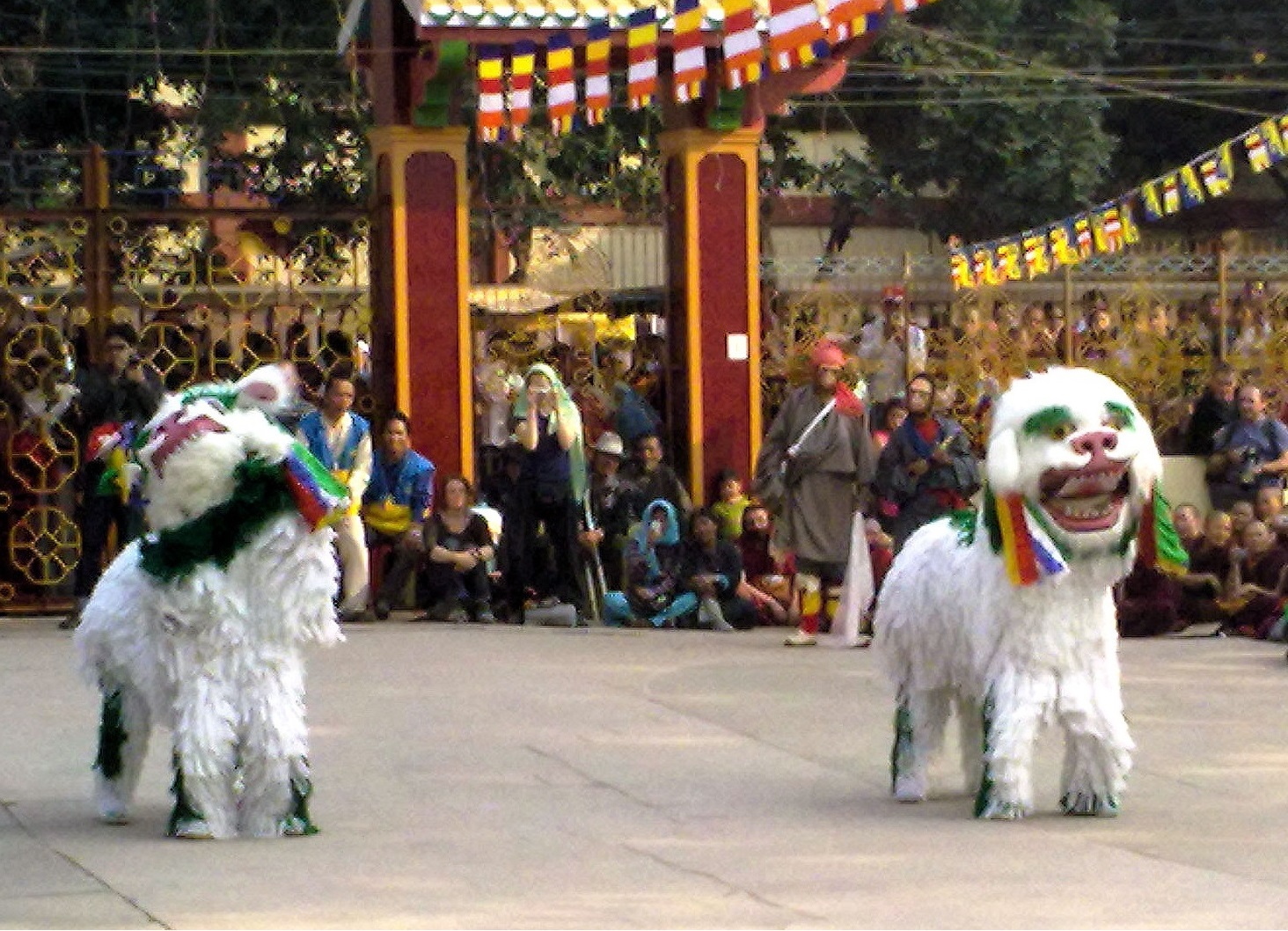
Tibetan Snow Lion dance, Bodhgaya, India

In the Himalayan and Tibetan area, there is also a lion dance called the Snow Lion dance. This dance may be found in Tibet and also among Tibetan diaspora communities where it is called Senggeh Garcham, Nepal, Bhutan, and parts of Northeastern India – among the Monpa people in Arunachal Pradesh, in Sikkim where it is called Singhi Chham, and in some parts of Uttar Pradesh and Ladakh. The name seng ge and its related forms come from Sanskrit for lion, siṅha, and cham is a Buddhist ritual dance. The snow lion has white fur, and in Tibet, it may also have a green mane or green fringes, while in Sikkim, the mane may be blue.

The snow lion is regarded as an emblem of Tibet, and the Snow Lion dance is popularly performed in Tibetan communities during festivals such as the ritual dance (cham) festival and the New Year. The snow lion represents the snowy mountain ranges and glaciers of Tibet and is considered highly auspicious, and it may also symbolize a number of characteristics, such as power and strength, and fearlessness and joy. Some local versions of the Snow Lion dance may also have been influenced by Chinese lion dance in the Sino-Tibetan borderland – for example, it was recorded that the local chief in Songpan, Sichuan, gave a lion costume to the Jamyang Zhépa II of the Amdo region in the 18th century. The Snow Lion dance may be performed as a secular dance or as a ritual dance performed by bon po monks.

=== India ===
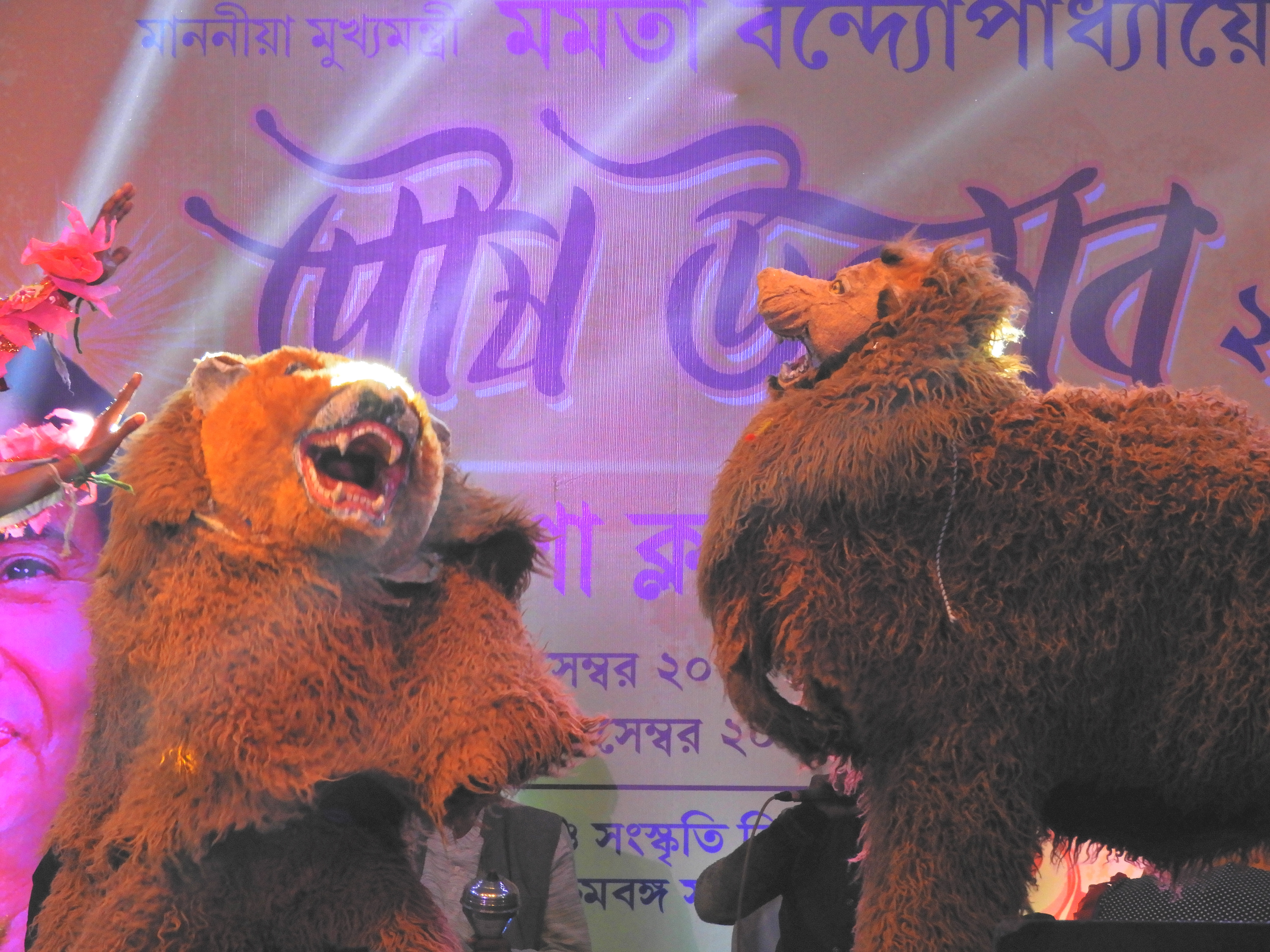
Purulia Chhau dance

Excluding the Snow Lion dances found in the Himalayan regions, lion costumes may be used in various forms of dances in other parts of India. In West Bengal's Purulia district, a version of the Chhau dance is the only one to incorporate lion costumes. In this dance, the lions are associated with the Hindu goddess Durga as her mount. The lion Chhau masks are made of papier-mâché with dried grass as fur.

In Songi Mukhawate or Songi Mukhota dance, a masked folk dance from Maharastra performed during Chaitra Purnima, Navaratri, and other special occasions, the lion costumes may also be used. The lion costumes represent Narasimha. In Honnavar Taluk in Uttara Kannada, a lion dance called simha nrutya may be performed in Yakshagana plays. The dancers wear a cotton mask that resembles a lion with two silver fangs, and dance in imitation of the movements and behaviour of lions.

=== Indonesia ===
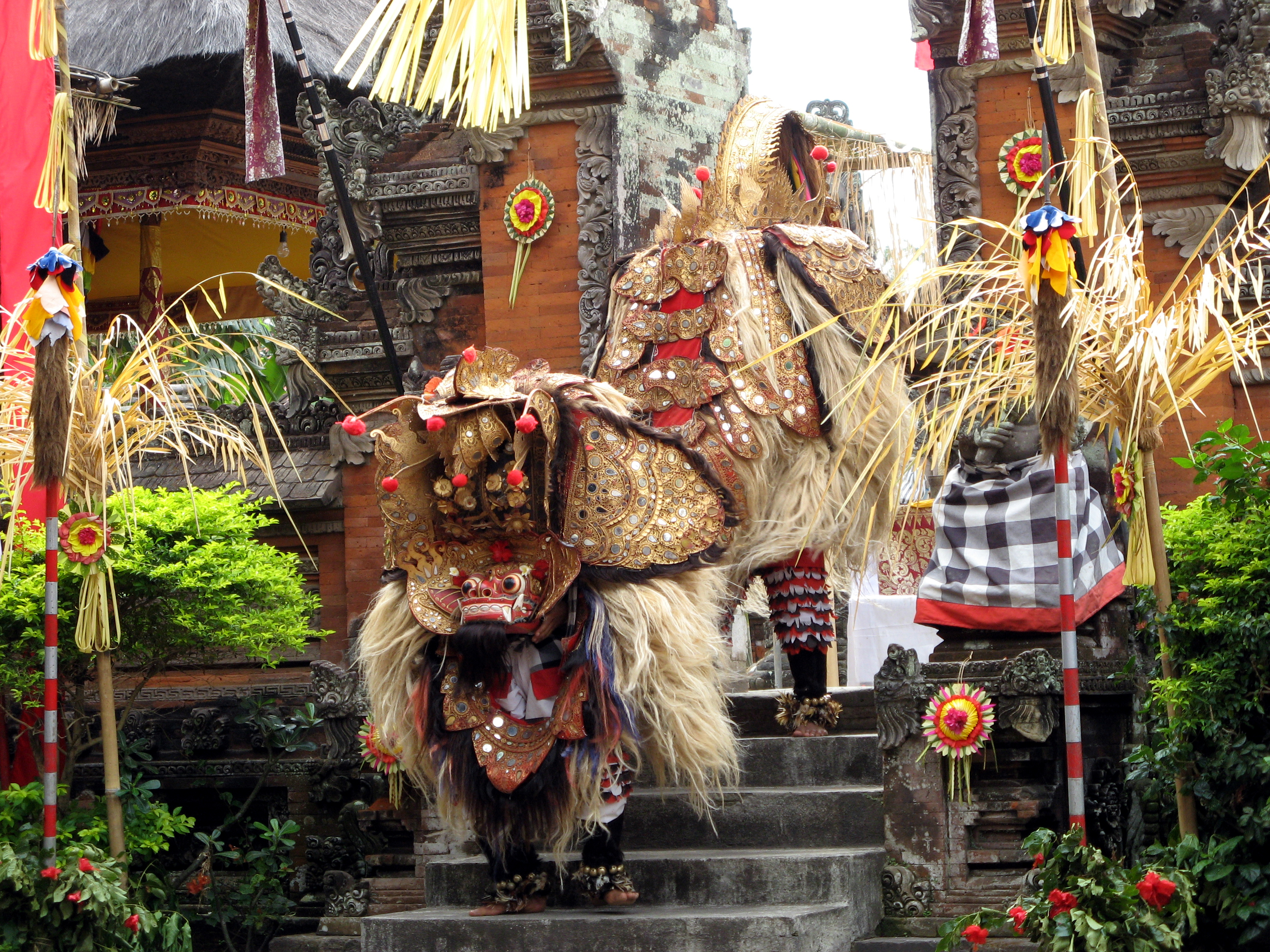
Barong of Bali, Indonesia

The Chinese lion dance is referred to as barongsai in Indonesia, often performed by Chinese Indonesians during Imlek. The majority of lion dance troupes in Medan perform the Southern Lion dance brought by the Chinese immigrants in the nineteenth century. They are divided into the Fo Shan Shi and the He Shan Shi types. Indonesians, however, have developed their own style of lion dances. The lion dance (Indonesian: barong) in Indonesia has different forms that are distinct to the local cultures in Indonesia, and it is not known if these have any relation to the Chinese lion.

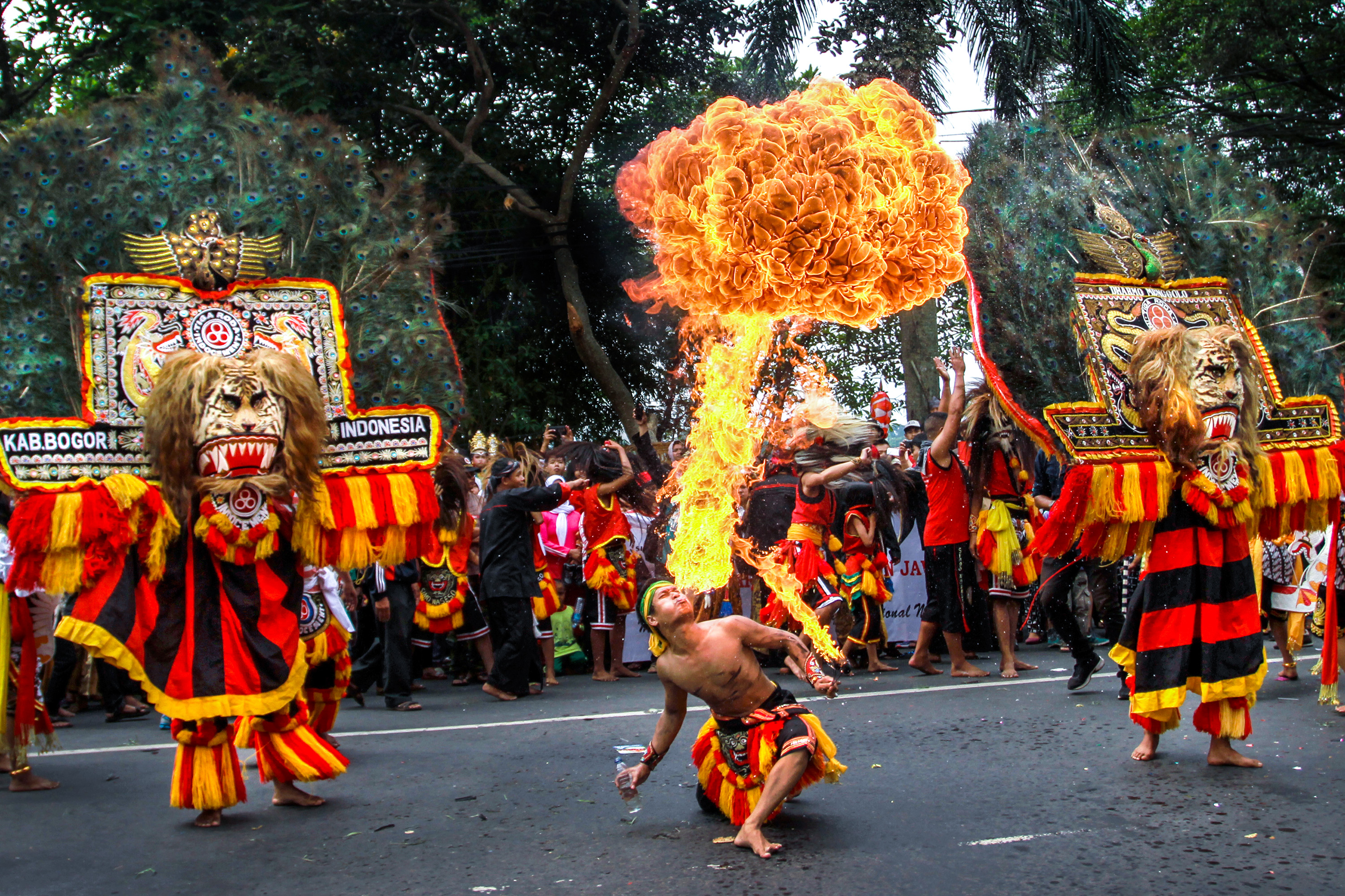
Reog Ponorogo, Indonesia

In Hindu Balinese culture, the Barong is the king of good spirits and the enemy of the demon queen Rangda. The Javanese Reog typically involves two dancers called Juru Saluk. In Ponorogo in Java, the Reog dance involves a lion figure known as the singa barong. A single dancer, or warok, carries the heavy lion mask, about 30–40 kg in weight, with their teeth, and may also carry an adolescent boy or girl on its head. The mask, which may span over 2.5 meters, has gained recognition as the world's largest mask.

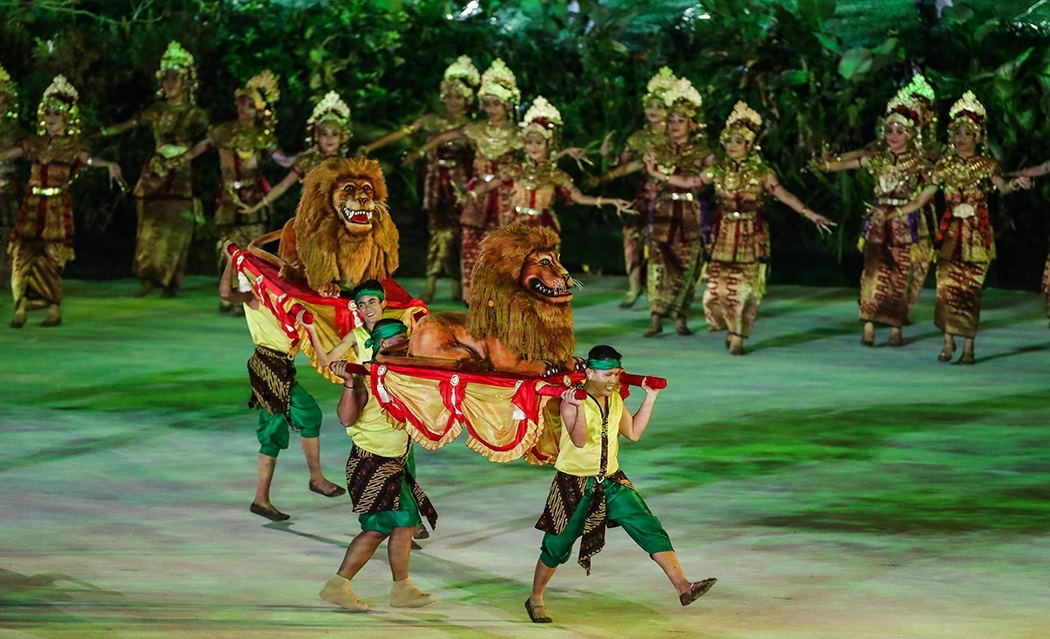
Sisingaan lion dance performance during 2018 Asian Games opening ceremony

Another form of Indonesian lion dance is called Sisingaan from West Java. Sisingaan is marked by a form of a lion-shaped effigy palanquin that is carried by a group of dancers who perform various attractions accompanied by traditional music. The dance is usually performed to celebrate the circumcision ceremony, where the circumcised child is carried on a lion around the kampung (village).

=== Africa ===
Around Africa there are various lion dances that are original to their local area and unrelated to the Chinese dance. For example, various tribes in East Africa, such as the Maasai and Samburu people of Kenya, used to perform a lion dance to celebrate a successful lion hunt, considered by these tribes to be a prestigious act and a sign of bravery. The dancers may also reenact a lion hunt. Some of them make a headdress out of the mane of the slain lion (or out of other animals) and wear the headdress in the dance. Young men may also wear the lion-mane headdress and dance in a coming-of-age ceremony. However, as lion hunting has now been made illegal, the dance is seldom performed in a real scenario nowadays, but they may continue to perform the dance for tourists. In the Gambia, a mask dance called Simba or Zimba, meaning "lion dancer" in the Wolof language, is performed in festivals and on the streets by the Wolof people.

== During Chinese New Years and festivals ==
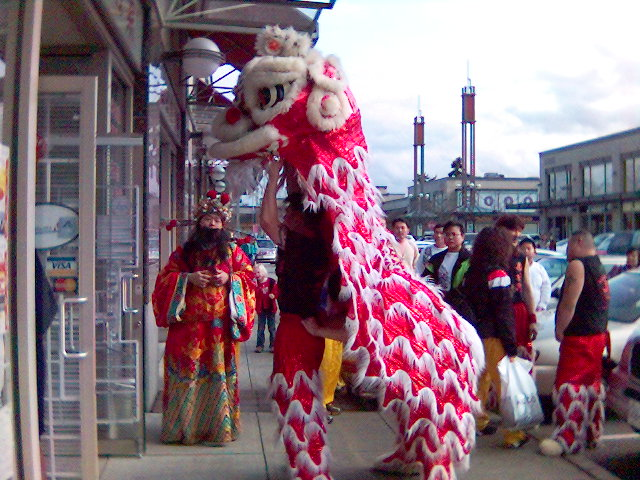
Chinese lion dancers performing a "cai qing" where the "greens" are hung high above for the lion to pluck

During the Chinese New Year, lion dance troupes may visit the houses and shops of the Asian community to perform the traditional custom of "cai qing" (採青), literally meaning "plucking the greens", whereby the lion takes an auspicious green lettuce either hung on a pole or placed on a table in front of the premises. The "greens" (qing) are tied together with a "red envelope" containing money, and the offering may also include auspicious fruits such as oranges. In Chinese, cǎi (採, pluck) also sounds like cài (菜, meaning vegetable) and cái (财, meaning fortune). The lion will dance and approach the "greens" and "red envelope" like a curious cat to "eat the green" and "spit" it out. In the process, they will keep the "red envelope", which is the reward for the lion troupe.

The lion dance is believed to bring good luck and fortune to any business that receives one. During the Qing dynasty, there may be additional hidden meanings in the performances. For example, the green vegetables (qing) eaten by the lion may represent the Qing Manchus. The lion dance troupes are sometimes accompanied by various characters such as the Big Head Buddha who teases the lion with a fan.

== Evolution and competition ==
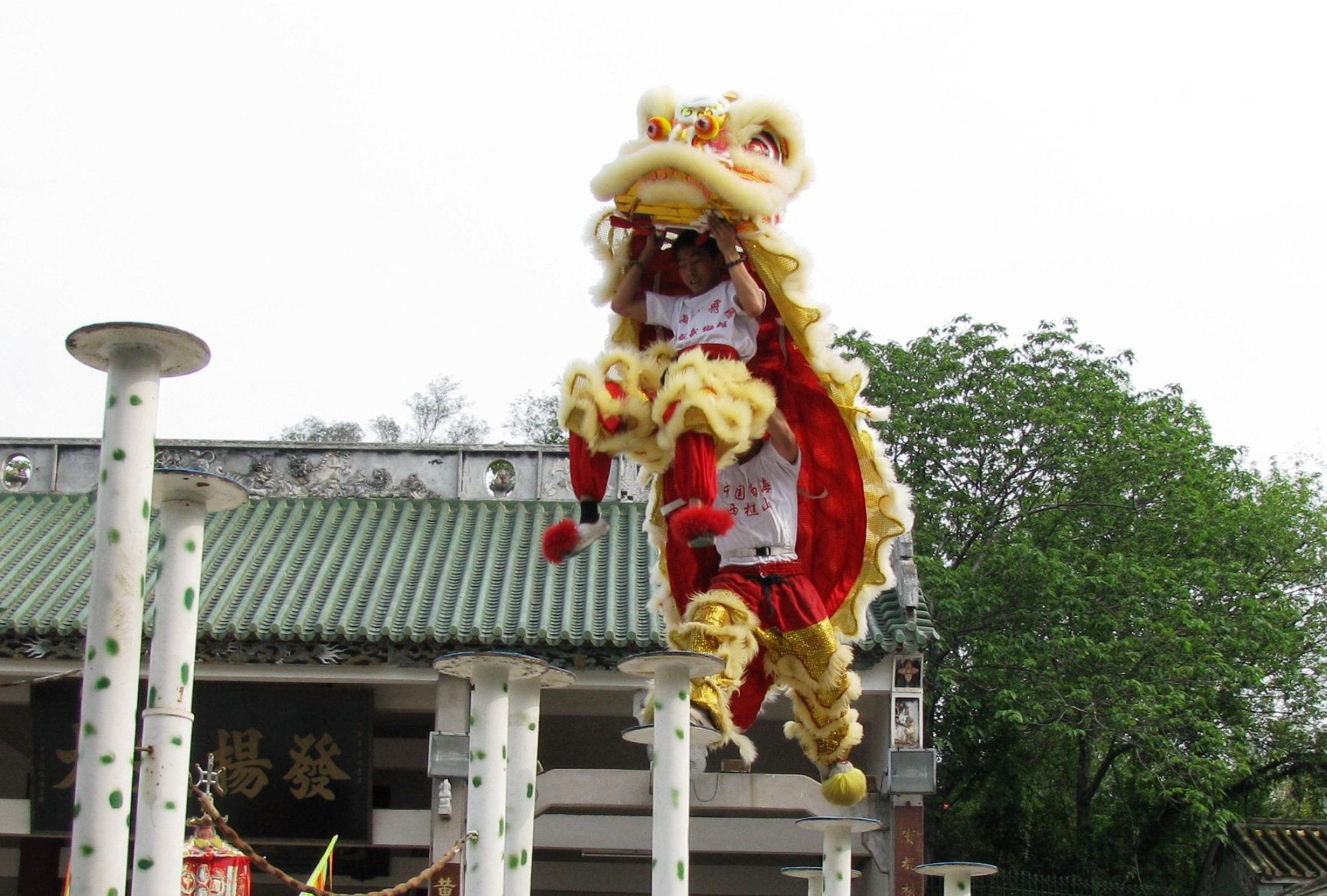
Lion dance in competition may be performed on a series of small circular platforms on poles.

Lion dance has spread across the world due to the worldwide presence of the diaspora Chinese communities and immigrant settlers in many countries in the Americas, Europe, Asia, Africa, Australia, Pacific Polynesia, and in particular, in Southeast Asia, where there is a large overseas Chinese presence.

=== High pole lion dance (jongs) ===
High pole lion dance (Chinese: 高樁; lit. 'high pole'), also known as “jongs”, takes its name from the Cantonese pronunciation of 樁 (Jyutping: zong1), stylized in English. This acrobatic style of lion dance is performed on metal poles reaching up to 2.8 meters (~8 ft) in height with gaps as wide as 1.8 meters (~5 ft). The origins of the high pole come from a kung fu training method where martial artists would practice on wooden pillars driven into the ground. These were known as plum blossom poles (梅花桩), their name is derived from the arrangement of the poles in the pattern of plum blossom petals. Siow Ho Phiew from Malaysia is recognised for adapting these plum blossom poles and standardising the high pole setup for competitions. A standard competition setup includes at least 21 poles, though larger sets are used in major events such as the Genting World Lion Dance Championship and the Malaysian National Lion Dance Championship.

=== Lion dance competitions ===
A lion dance competition, World Lion Dance Championship, was initiated in Malaysia in 1984. Held biennially around July at Resorts World Genting, north of Kuala Lumpur, Malaysia, the Genting World Lion Dance Championship (雲頂世界獅王爭霸賽) is widely regarded as the pinnacle of lion dance competition, drawing elite teams from Asia, Europe, Australia, and North America. The event was not held in 2020 and 2022, resuming in 2023. Due to the need to perform difficult stunts in this competitions, Malaysian teams are believed to be the first to merge southern-style lion head with a shorter northern-style tail, and this trend has spread to Hong Kong and southern China.

The Ngee Ann City National Lion Dance Championships are an annual competition in Singapore, launched in the 1990s, held at Ngee Ann City on Orchard Road.

== In politics ==
The lion dance is seen as a representative part of Chinese culture in many overseas Chinese communities, and in some Southeast Asian countries, there were attempts to ban or discourage the dance in order to suppress Chinese cultural identity in those countries. For example, in Malaysia, lion dance was criticized by a Malay politician in the 1970s as not Malaysian in style, and the politician suggested that it be changed to a tiger dance. Permits to perform it were not given by the government, except at Chinese New Year, after the National Cultural Policy (Dasar Kebudayaan Negara) was implemented from 1981 until 1990. Lion dance became a matter of political and public debate about the national culture of the country. Attempts were made to integrate the lion dance into a Malaysian national culture by incorporating Malay and Indian instruments during the 1Malaysia campaign launched in 2008.

During the Suharto era in Indonesia, public expression of Chinese culture was also banned in accord with anti-communism sentiment, and the barongsai (lion dance) procession was considered "provocative" and "an affront to Indonesian nationalism". This ban was however overturned after the collapse of the Suharto regime in 1998, with then-president Abdurrahman Wahid lifting the ban. Nevertheless, the occasional local banning of the lion dance still occurred.

During the 1950s–60s, in some areas with high populations of Chinese and Asian communities (especially Chinatowns in many foreign countries outside of China), people who joined lion dance troupes were considered "gangster-like". This caused a lot of fighting between lion dance troupes and kung fu schools. A few performers hid daggers in their shoes and clothes, which could be used to injure other lion dancers' legs. At one point, the Hong Kong government banned lion dances completely. More recently, lion dance troupes must attain a permit from the government in order to perform lion dance. It has been argued that the regulation was implemented to prevent lawbreakers from being involved. The Building and Construction Authority (BCA) stated that lion dances involving the "cai qing" ritual are not allowed to take place in condominiums and inside units during Chinese New Year. BCA also urged the Management Corporation Strata Titles (MCSTs) to increase surveillance at common areas during the festivities.

== In popular culture ==
In the 1960s and 1970s, kung fu movies indirectly showed how lion dance was practiced in close connection with kung fu during that time, e.g., Dreadnaught and Martial Club. In those days, the lion dance was mostly practised and performed as one aspect of wushu or kung fu skills, with challenge courses for the "lion" built of chairs and tables stacked up together for the "lion" to perform its stunts. In the 1976 musical Pacific Overtures by Stephen Sondheim, the first act ends with a musical number titled "Lion Dance". The Commodore Perry character performs a mixture of a kabuki version of lion dance and a cakewalk wearing an Uncle Sam costume and the long white wig and makeup of a kabuki lion, here used to express his feelings of success at having met with Japanese officials and opened Japan to trade for the first time in 250 years. The kabuki lion dance also appeared in the 1957 film Sayonara with Ricardo Montalbán.

Several 1990s movies, such as the sequels of Once Upon a Time in China, involve plots centered on lion dancing, especially Once Upon a Time in China III and Once Upon a Time in China IV. The series' main actor, Jet Li, has performed as a lion dancer in several of his films, including Northern Lion dancing in Shaolin Temple, Shaolin Temple 2: Kids from Shaolin, Shaolin Temple 3: North and South Shaolin, and Southern Lion dancing in Once Upon a Time in China III and Once Upon a Time in China and America.

Other films include The Young Master, Dancing Lion, The Lion Men, The Lion Men: Ultimate Showdown, I Am What I Am and I Am What I Am 2. Northern Lion dancing appears in Disney's 1998 film Mulan, when the Hun villains sneak into the imperial city disguised as a large imperial lion. Lion dance has also appeared in popular music videos, such as Chinese hip hop group Higher Brothers music video for their single "Open It Up", Adam Lambert's music video "If I Had You", and Zayn Malik featuring Sia's music video "Dusk Till Dawn". It has also appeared in a music video "True To Your Heart" by 98 Degrees featuring Stevie Wonder, which was used to advertise the 1998 film Mulan.

In 2014, the film The Great Lion: Kun Seng Keng (Chinese: 大舞獅-關聖官) was released, based on the true story of Muar's Kun Seng Keng lion dance troupe and its members, including multi-time world champion Chong Kok Fu.

The version 4.4 of the video game Genshin Impact introduced the playable character Yip Gaming, a "Wushou Dance" performer, which is Liyue's version of the lion dance. In Honkai Star Rail, Diting is a type of Ingenium lion-dog created by the Xianzhou Artisanship Commission, which resembles the type of lion-dogs seen in the Lion dance. Another video game, Wuthering Waves, features the character Lingyang, a "Liondancer" from the city of Jinzhou.

The Elden Ring downloadable content Elden Ring Shadow of the Erdtree introduces a new boss type known as the "Divine Beast Dancing Lion". Its appearance is akin to that of the Chinese Northern Lion. During the second phase of the battle, the Lion jumps into the sky and enters three elemental forms: lightning, ice, and wind.

=== Romance of the Three Kingdoms ===
As a romanticized novel based on the history of the Three Kingdoms period, the historical novel Romance of the Three Kingdoms refers to Guan Yu, Zhang Fei, Huang Zhong, Ma Chao and Zhao Yun as the "Five Tiger Generals" which served under Liu Bei. Many of the prominent characters from the novel are the namesakes of particular styles of lion dance costumes.

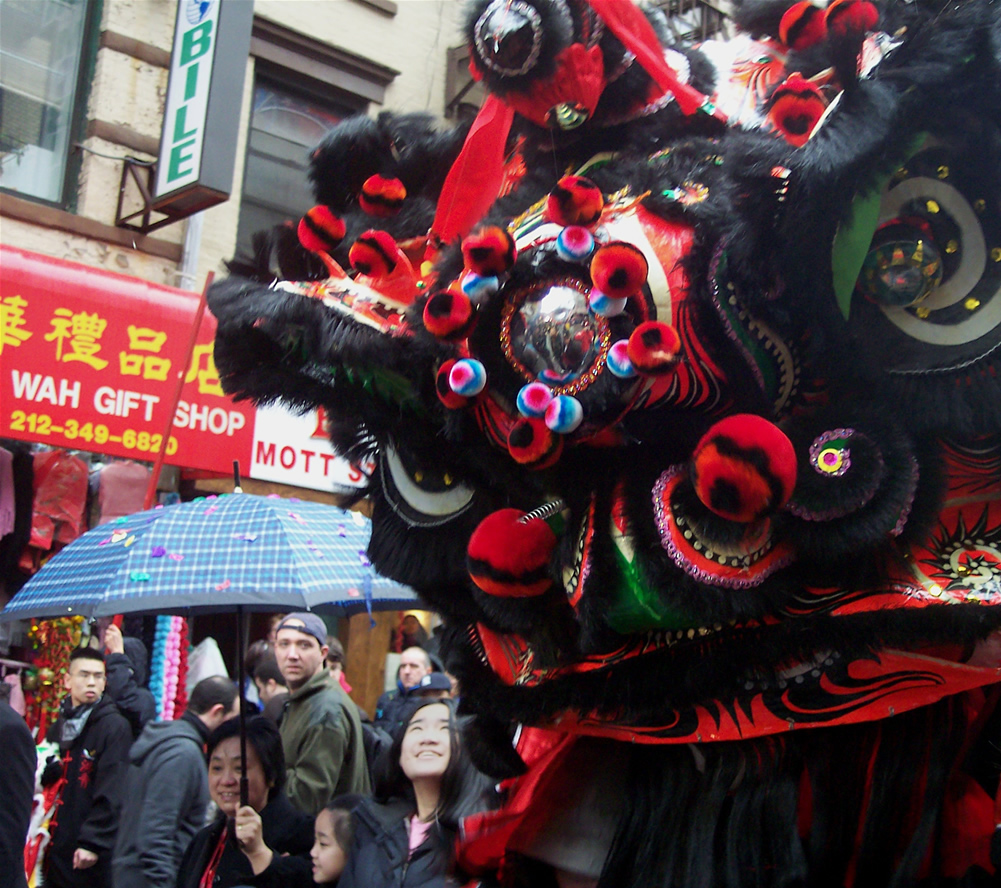
A Cantonese Guan Gong (Kwan Kung) lion ushers in the Chinese New Year in Chinatown, Manhattan, New York City (US)

==== Liu Bei ====
The Liu Bei (Cantonese: Lau Pei) lion is the eldest of the three brothers and has a yellow face with a white beard and fur (to denote his wisdom) and a multicolored tail signifying the colors of the five elements. There are three coins on the collar.

==== Guan Gong ====
The Guan Gong lion has a red face, black bristles, and a long black beard (as he was also known as the "Duke with the Beautiful Beard"). The tail is red and trimmed with black. He is known as the second brother and sports two coins on the collar.

==== Zhang Fei ====
The Zhang Fei lion has a black face with a short black beard, small ears, and black bristles. The tail is black and white. Traditionally this lion also has bells attached to the body as well as various designs. Being the youngest of the three brothers, there is only a single coin on the collar.

==== Zhao Yun ====
The Zhao Yun lion has a green face, a green tail, black beard and fur, and an iron horn. Often called the fourth brother, this lion is also called the Heroic Lion because Zhao is said to have ridden through Cao Cao's million-man army to rescue Liu Bei's infant and fought his way back out.

==== Huang Zhong ====
The Huang Zhong lion is a yellow lion with a yellow or orange face and body with white or silver beard and fur.

==== Ma Chao ====
The white lion is known as Ma Chao because Ma always wore a white armband in his battle against the ruler of Wei, Cao Cao, to signify that he was in mourning for his father and brother, who had been murdered by Cao Cao. This lion is therefore also known as the funeral lion, and is never used except for the funeral of an important leader. In such cases the lion is usually burned right after use as it is considered symbolically inauspicious or ill-fated to be kept around. This lion is sometimes confused with the silver lion, which sometimes has a whitish coloring.

== See also ==
- Chinese New Year
- Japanese New Year
- Vietnamese New Year (Tết)
- Korean New Year
- Culture of China
- Chinese guardian lions
- Dance in China
- Pantomime horse
- Dragon dance
- Tiger dance
- Qilin dance
- Shisa
