= Outline of South Korea =

Country in East Asia

The flag of South Korea

The Emblem of South Korea

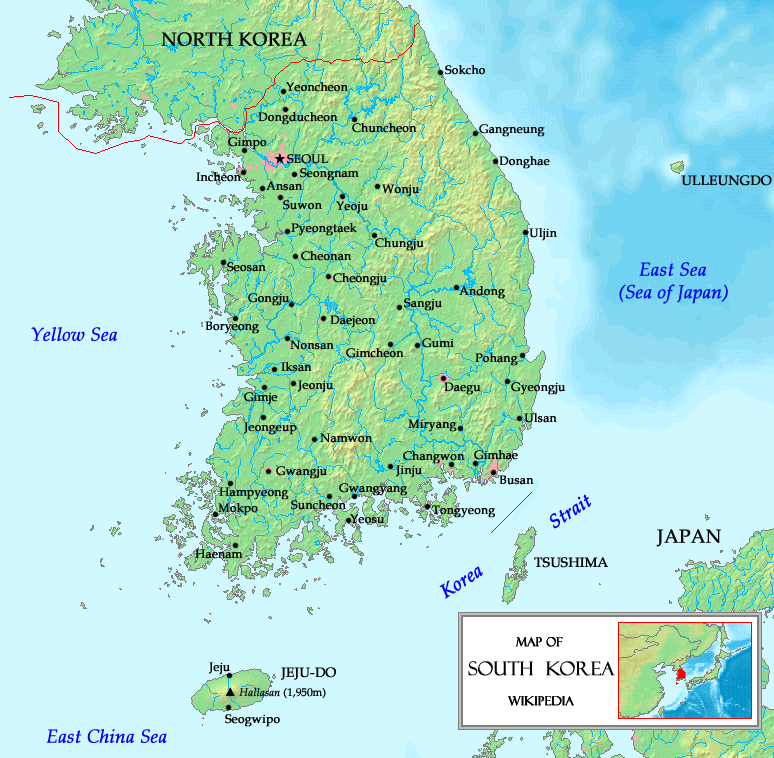
An enlargeable map of South Korea

The following outline is provided as an overview of and topical guide to South Korea:

South Korea – densely populated sovereign presidential republic located on the southern half of the Korean Peninsula in East Asia. Also known as the "Land of the Morning Calm". It is neighbored by China to the west, Japan to the east and North Korea to the north. South Korea's capital and largest city is Seoul, the world's second largest metropolitan city.

Korea has a history of 5,000 years, with its foundation dating back to 2333 BC by the Dangun. Following the unification of the Three Korean Kingdoms under Silla in AD 668, Korea went through the Goryeo and Joseon Dynasty as one nation until annexed by Japan in 1910. After Japan's defeat in World War II, Korea was divided, and South Korea was established in 1948. It has since developed a successful democracy, maintaining a strong alliance with the United States.

South Korea has the fourth-largest economy in Asia. It had one of the world's fastest growing economies from the 1960s until 1980 and is now considered a developed economy. It is a G20 and OECD member. In response to tension with North Korea, it has developed the world's sixth largest armed forces and has one of the 10-largest defence budgets in the world.

South Korean industries have a strong focus on science and technology. It has an advanced infrastructure and information technology such as electronics, semiconductors, LCDs, computers, mobile phones and automotive industry led by Chaebol, a kind of family-owned conglomerate. The economy also has a strong focus on engineering, construction, machinery, textiles, petrochemicals, biotechnology and robotics.

== General reference ==
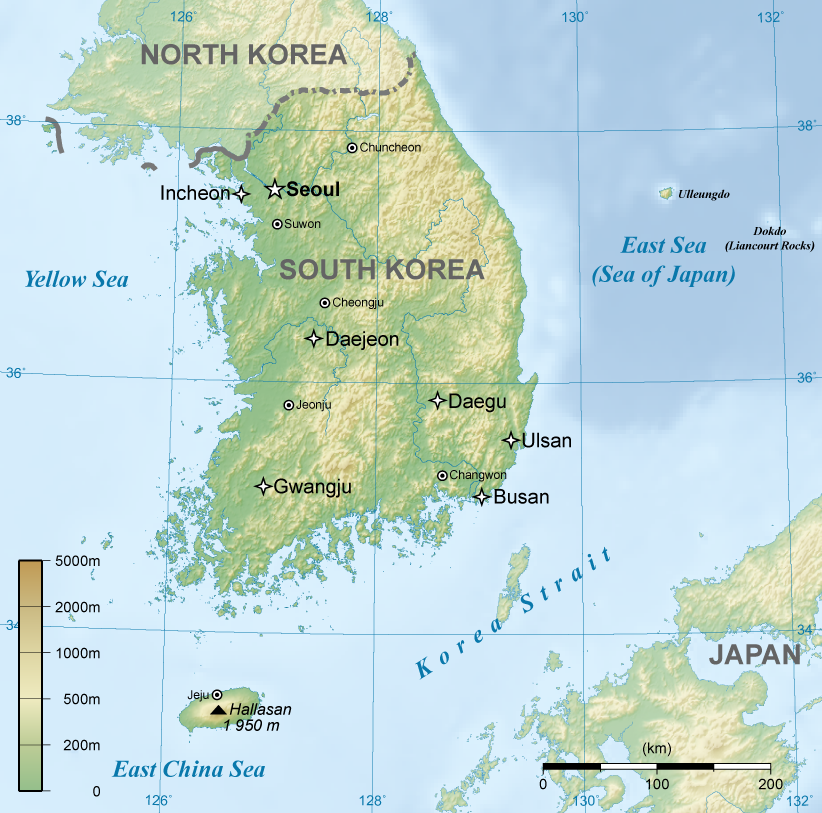
An enlargeable basic map of South Korea

- Pronunciation: /kəˈriːə/
  - Korean: [haːn.ɡuk]
- Common English country name: South Korea
- Official English country name: The Republic of Korea
- Common endonym(s): 한국 (韓國) (Hanguk)
- Official endonym(s): 대한민국 (大韓民國) (Daehanminguk)
- Adjectival(s): South Korean
- Demonym(s): Korean, South Korean
- Etymology: Name of South Korea
- International rankings of South Korea
- ISO country codes: KR, KOR, 410
- ISO region codes: See ISO 3166-2:KR
- Internet country code top-level domain: .kr

== Geography of South Korea ==
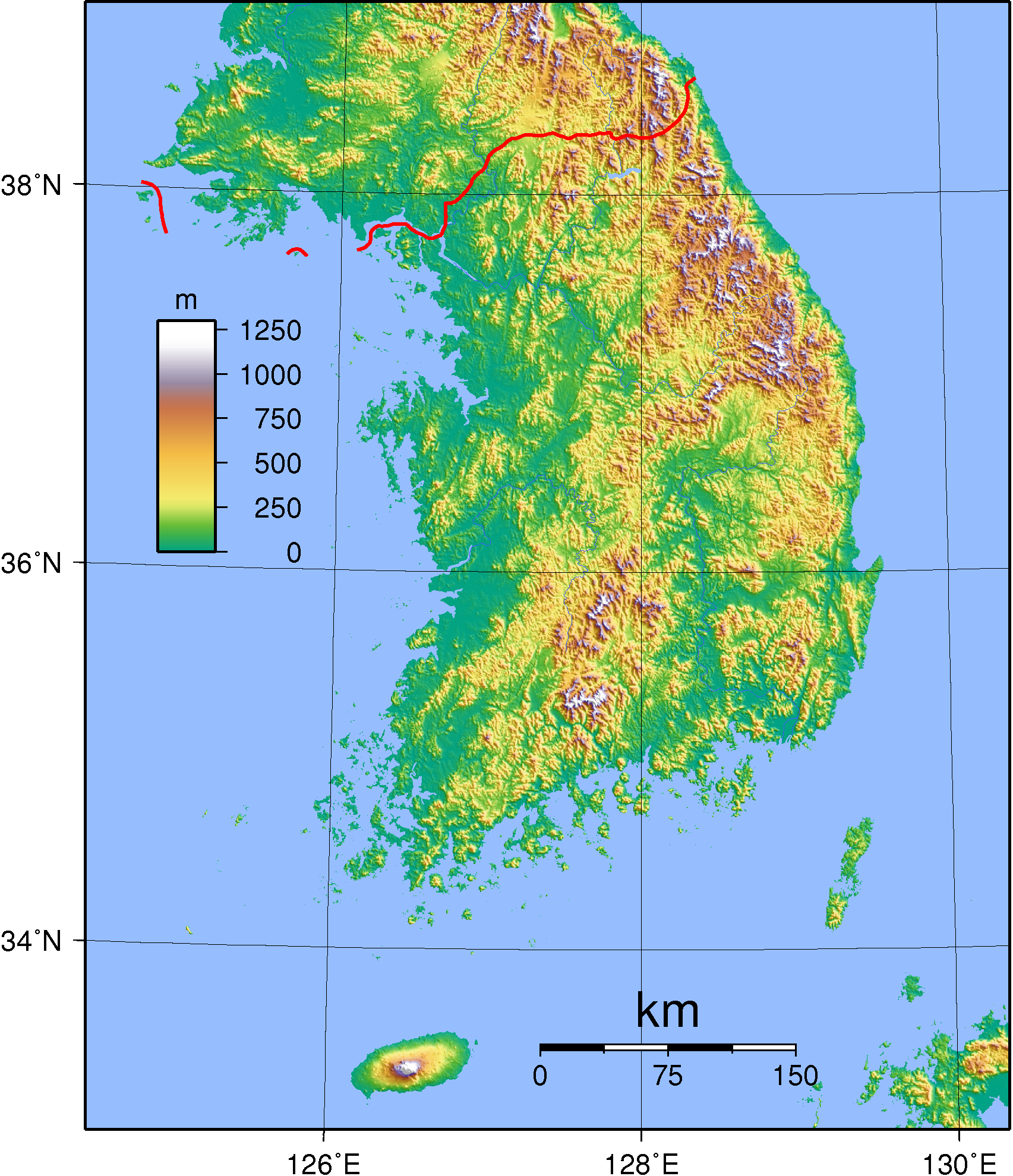
An enlargeable topographic map of South Korea

- South Korea is: a country
- Location:
  - Northern Hemisphere and Eastern Hemisphere
  - Eurasia
    - Asia
      - East Asia
        - Korean Peninsula
  - Time zone: Korea Standard Time (UTC+09)
  - Extreme points of South Korea
    - High: Halla-san 1,950 m (6,398 ft)
    - Low: Sea of Japan and Yellow Sea 0 m
  - Land boundaries: North Korea 238 km
  - Coastline: 2,413 km
- Population of South Korea: 50,004,441 - 29th most populous country
- Area of South Korea: 100,472.4 km^{2}
- Atlas of South Korea
- Addresses in South Korea

=== Environment of South Korea ===
The twenty-two national parks of South Korea.
Land-based parks are in red and marine parks are in blue.

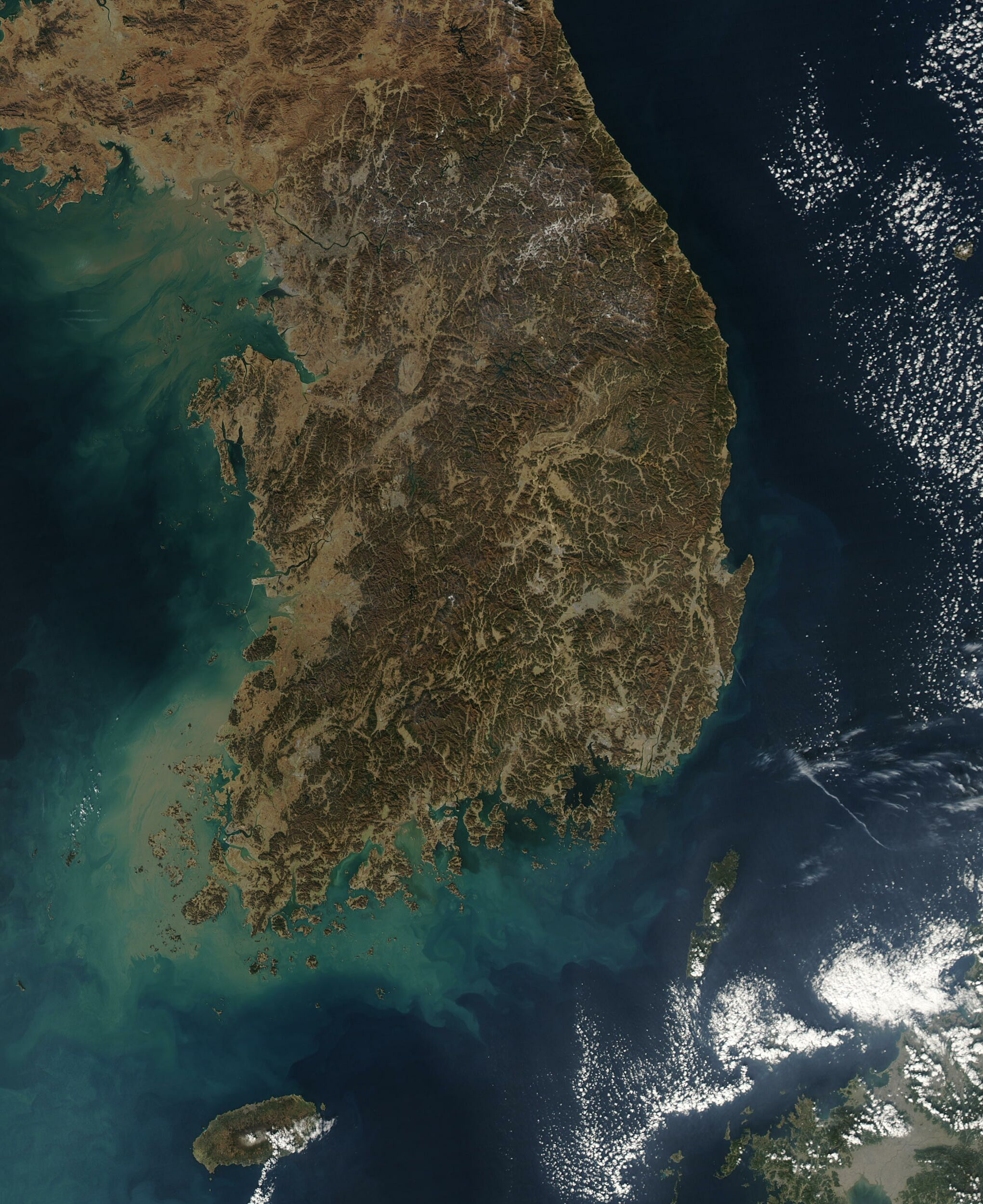
An enlargeable satellite image of South Korea

- Climate of South Korea
  - Climate change in South Korea
- Environmental issues in South Korea
  - Environmental conditions of South Korea
- Energy in South Korea
  - Renewable energy in South Korea
  - Power stations in South Korea
  - Nuclear power in South Korea
    - Anti-nuclear movement in South Korea
  - Solar power in South Korea
  - Wind power in South Korea
- Geology of South Korea
- National parks of South Korea
- Wildlife of South Korea
  - Fauna of South Korea
    - Birds of South Korea
    - Mammals of South Korea

==== Natural geographic features of South Korea ====
- Islands of South Korea
- Lakes of South Korea
- Mountains of South Korea
  - Volcanoes in South Korea
- Rivers of South Korea
  - Waterfalls of South Korea
- Valleys of South Korea
- World Heritage Sites in South Korea

=== Regions of South Korea ===
- Gyeonggi
  - Seoul
  - Incheon
  - Gyeonggi Province
- Hoseo
  - Daejeon
  - Sejong
  - North Chungcheong Province
  - South Chungcheong Province
- Honam
  - Gwangju
  - North Jeolla Province
  - South Jeolla Province
  - Jeju Province
- Yeongnam
  - Busan
  - Daegu
  - Ulsan
  - North Gyeongsang Province
  - South Gyeongsang Province

==== Administrative divisions of South Korea ====
- Si of South Korea
- Gun of South Korea
- Gu of South Korea
  - Eup of South Korea
  - Myun of South Korea
  - Dong of South Korea
  - Ri of South Korea

===== Municipalities of South Korea =====
- Capital of South Korea: Seoul
- Cities of South Korea

=== Demography of South Korea ===
- Aging of South Korea

== Government and politics of South Korea ==
- Form of government: presidential representative democratic republic
- Capital of South Korea: Seoul
- Elections in South Korea
  - Presidential elections in South Korea
  - Legislative elections in South Korea
- Political parties in South Korea
  - Progressivism in South Korea
  - Liberalism in South Korea
  - Conservatism in South Korea
- Human rights in South Korea
- Health care system in South Korea
- Constitution of South Korea

=== Branches of the government of South Korea ===
- Orders, decorations, and medals of South Korea

=== Executive branch of South Korea ===
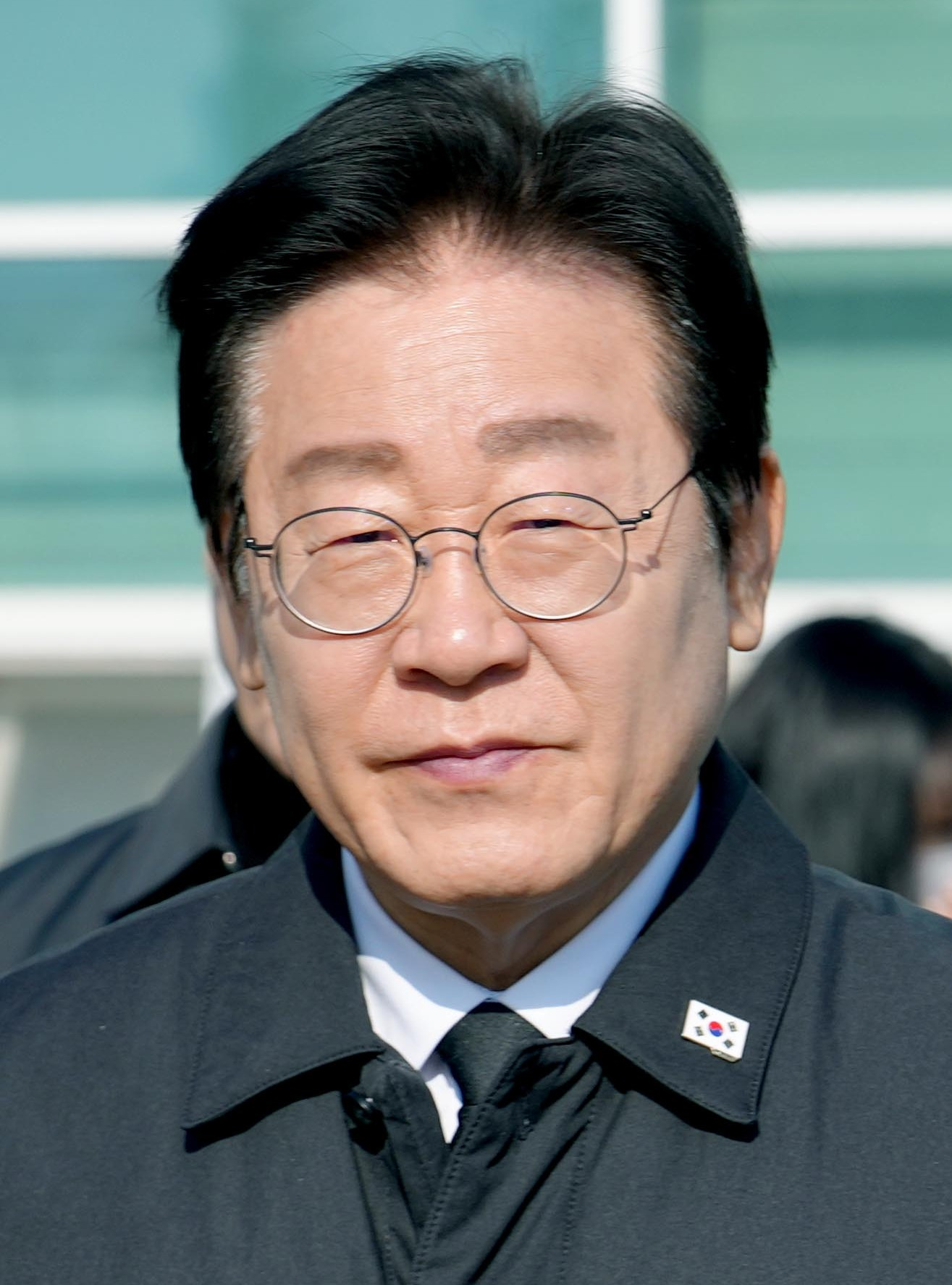
Lee Jae-myung, President of South Korea

- Head of state: President of South Korea,
- Head of government: President of South Korea,
- Cabinet of South Korea
- Ministries of South Korea
  - Ministry of Economy and Finance
  - Ministry of Education
  - Ministry of Science and ICT
  - Ministry of Foreign Affairs
  - Ministry of Unification
  - Ministry of Justice
  - Ministry of National Defense
  - Ministry of the Interior and Safety
  - Ministry of Patriots and Veterans Affairs
  - Ministry of Culture, Sports and Tourism
  - Ministry of Agriculture, Food and Rural Affairs
  - Ministry of Trade, Industry and Energy
  - Ministry of Health and Welfare
  - Ministry of Environment
  - Ministry of Employment and Labor
  - Ministry of Gender Equality and Family
  - Ministry of Land, Infrastructure and Transport
  - Ministry of Oceans and Fisheries
  - Ministry of SMEs and Startups

==== Legislative branch of South Korea ====
- Parliament of South Korea (unicameral)
- Members of the National Assembly

==== Judicial branch of South Korea ====
- Supreme Court of Korea
- Constitutional Court of Korea

=== Foreign relations of South Korea ===
- Diplomatic missions in South Korea
- Diplomatic missions of South Korea
- Foreign policy of South Korea
  - Indo-Pacific Strategy of South Korea
- South Korea free trade agreements

==== International organization membership ====
The Republic of Korea is a member of:

- African Development Bank Group (AfDB) (nonregional member)
- Asian Development Bank (ADB)
- Asia-Pacific Economic Cooperation (APEC)
- Asia-Pacific Telecommunity (APT)
- Association of Southeast Asian Nations (ASEAN) (dialogue partner)
- Association of Southeast Asian Nations Regional Forum (ARF)
- Australia Group
- Bank for International Settlements (BIS)
- Colombo Plan (CP)
- East Asia Summit (EAS)
- European Bank for Reconstruction and Development (EBRD)
- Food and Agriculture Organization (FAO)
- Group of Twenty Finance Ministers and Central Bank Governors (G20)
- Inter-American Development Bank (IADB)
- International Atomic Energy Agency (IAEA)
- International Bank for Reconstruction and Development (IBRD)
- International Chamber of Commerce (ICC)
- International Civil Aviation Organization (ICAO)
- International Criminal Court (ICCt)
- International Criminal Police Organization (Interpol)
- International Development Association (IDA)
- International Energy Agency (IEA)
- International Federation of Red Cross and Red Crescent Societies (IFRCS)
- International Finance Corporation (IFC)
- International Fund for Agricultural Development (IFAD)
- International Hydrographic Organization (IHO)
- International Labour Organization (ILO)
- International Maritime Organization (IMO)
- International Mobile Satellite Organization (IMSO)
- International Monetary Fund (IMF)
- International Olympic Committee (IOC)
- International Organization for Migration (IOM)
- International Organization for Standardization (ISO)
- International Red Cross and Red Crescent Movement (ICRM)
- International Telecommunication Union (ITU)
- International Telecommunications Satellite Organization (ITSO)
- International Trade Union Confederation (ITUC)
- Inter-Parliamentary Union (IPU)
- Latin American Integration Association (LAIA)
- Multilateral Investment Guarantee Agency (MIGA)
- Nuclear Energy Agency (NEA)
- Nuclear Suppliers Group (NSG)
- Organisation for Economic Co-operation and Development (OECD)
- Organization for Security and Cooperation in Europe (OSCE) (partner)
- Organisation for the Prohibition of Chemical Weapons (OPCW)
- Organization of American States (OAS) (observer)
- Pacific Islands Forum (PIF) (partner)
- Paris Club
- Permanent Court of Arbitration (PCA)
- South Asian Association for Regional Cooperation (SAARC) (observer)
- United Nations (UN)
- United Nations Conference on Trade and Development (UNCTAD)
- United Nations Educational, Scientific, and Cultural Organization (UNESCO)
- United Nations High Commissioner for Refugees (UNHCR)
- United Nations Industrial Development Organization (UNIDO)
- United Nations Interim Force in Lebanon (UNIFIL)
- United Nations Military Observer Group in India and Pakistan (UNMOGIP)
- United Nations Mission in Liberia (UNMIL)
- United Nations Mission in the Sudan (UNMIS)
- United Nations Observer Mission in Georgia (UNOMIG)
- Universal Postal Union (UPU)
- World Confederation of Labour (WCL)
- World Customs Organization (WCO)
- World Federation of Trade Unions (WFTU)
- World Health Organization (WHO)
- World Intellectual Property Organization (WIPO)
- World Meteorological Organization (WMO)
- World Tourism Organization (UNWTO)
- World Trade Organization (WTO)
- Zangger Committee (ZC)

=== Law in South Korea ===
- Cannabis in South Korea
- Capital punishment in South Korea
- Constitution of South Korea
- Crime in South Korea
- Human rights in South Korea
  - LGBT rights in South Korea
  - Freedom of religion in South Korea
- Law enforcement in South Korea

=== Military of South Korea ===
- Command
  - Commander-in-chief:
    - Ministry of Defence of South Korea
- Forces
  - Army of South Korea
  - Navy of South Korea
  - Air Force of South Korea
  - Special forces of South Korea
- Military history of South Korea
- Military ranks of South Korea

== History of South Korea ==
- Timeline of Korean history
- Economic history of South Korea

=== History of Korea ===
- Gojoseon
- Jin (Korean state)
- Four Commanderies of Han
- Proto–Three Kingdoms of Korea
  - Buyeo
  - Okjeo
  - Eastern Ye
- Three Kingdoms of Korea
  - Goguryeo
  - Baekje
  - Silla
  - Gaya confederacy
- North–South States Period
  - United Silla
  - Balhae
  - Later Three Kingdoms
- Goryeo
- Joseon
- Korean Empire
  - Korea under Japanese rule
  - Division of Korea
  - Provisional Government of the Republic of Korea

== Culture of South Korea ==
- Architecture of South Korea
- Cuisine of South Korea
- Festivals in South Korea
- Languages of South Korea
- Media in South Korea
  - International mass media of South Korea
- National symbols of South Korea
  - Emblem of South Korea
  - Flag of South Korea
  - National anthem of South Korea
- People of South Korea
- Prostitution in South Korea
- Public holidays in South Korea
- Religion in South Korea
- World Heritage Sites in South Korea
- Museums in South Korea
- Korean wave
- K-Beauty

=== Architecture of South Korea ===
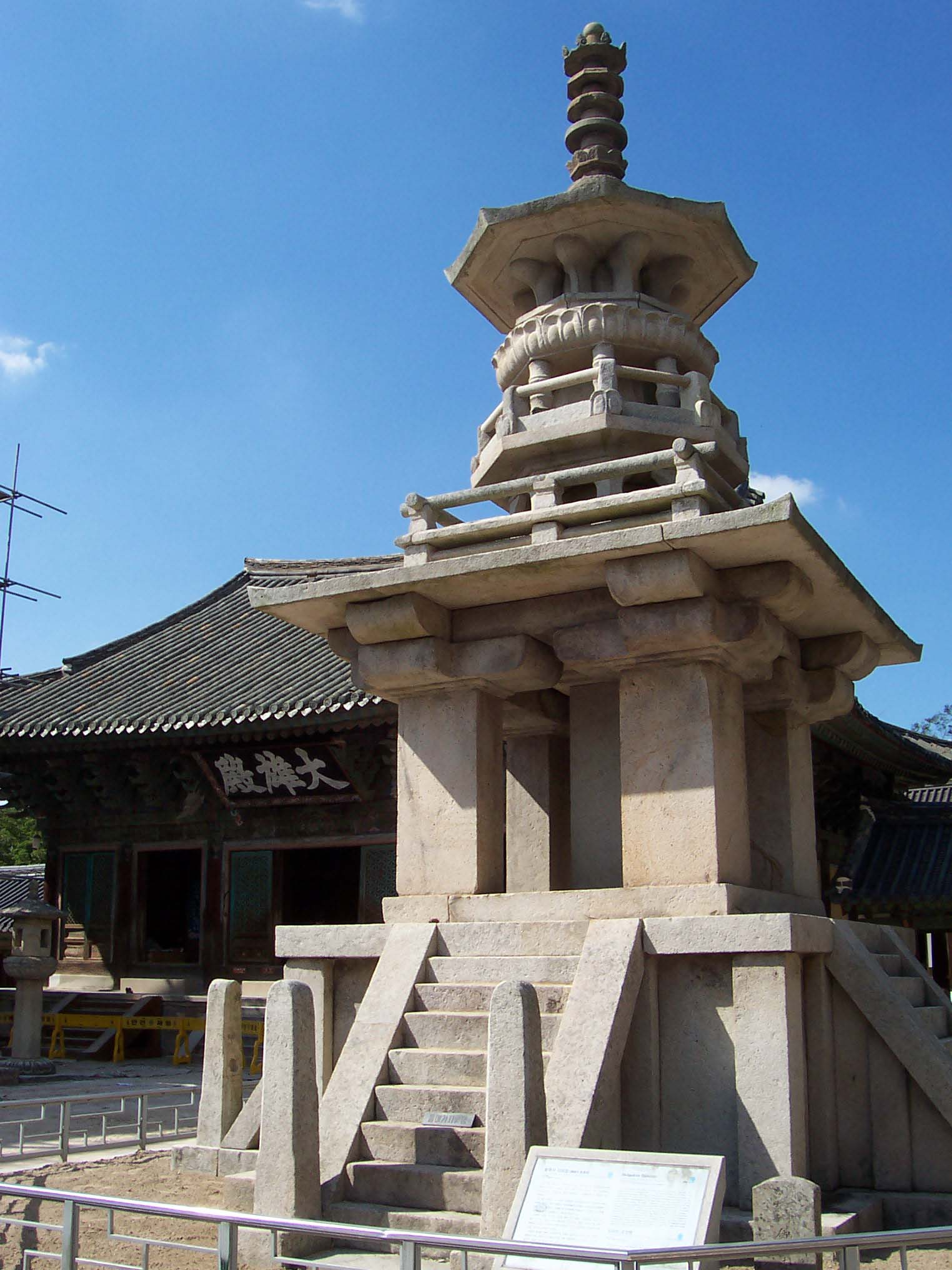
Dabotap

- Korean fortress
- Korean pagoda
- Gates in Korea
- Architecture of South Korea
- Korean Folk Village
- Hanok
- Korean architects
- Housing in South Korea

=== Art in South Korea ===
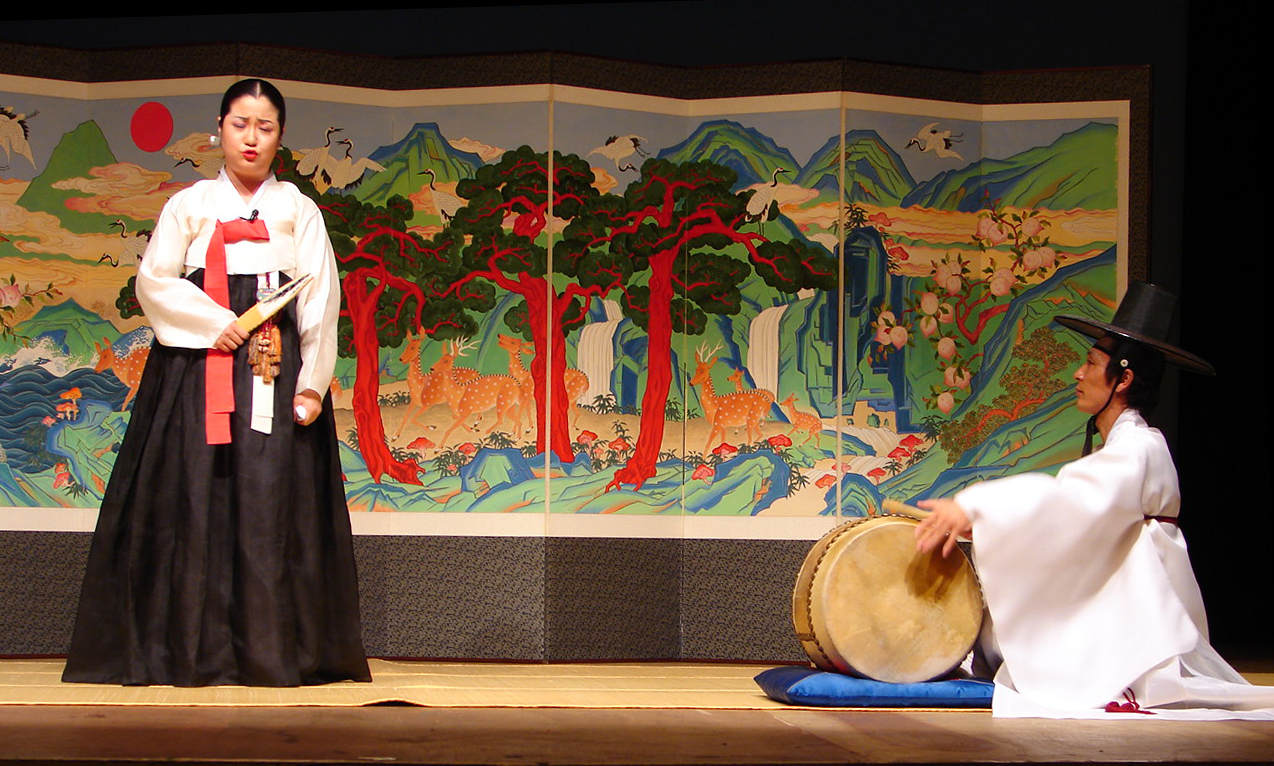
Pansori

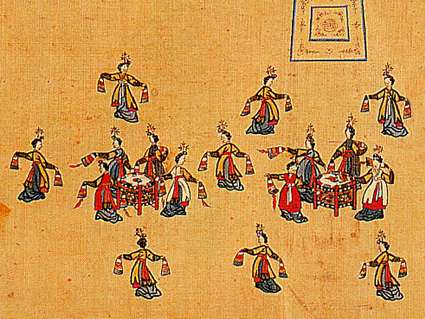
mugo

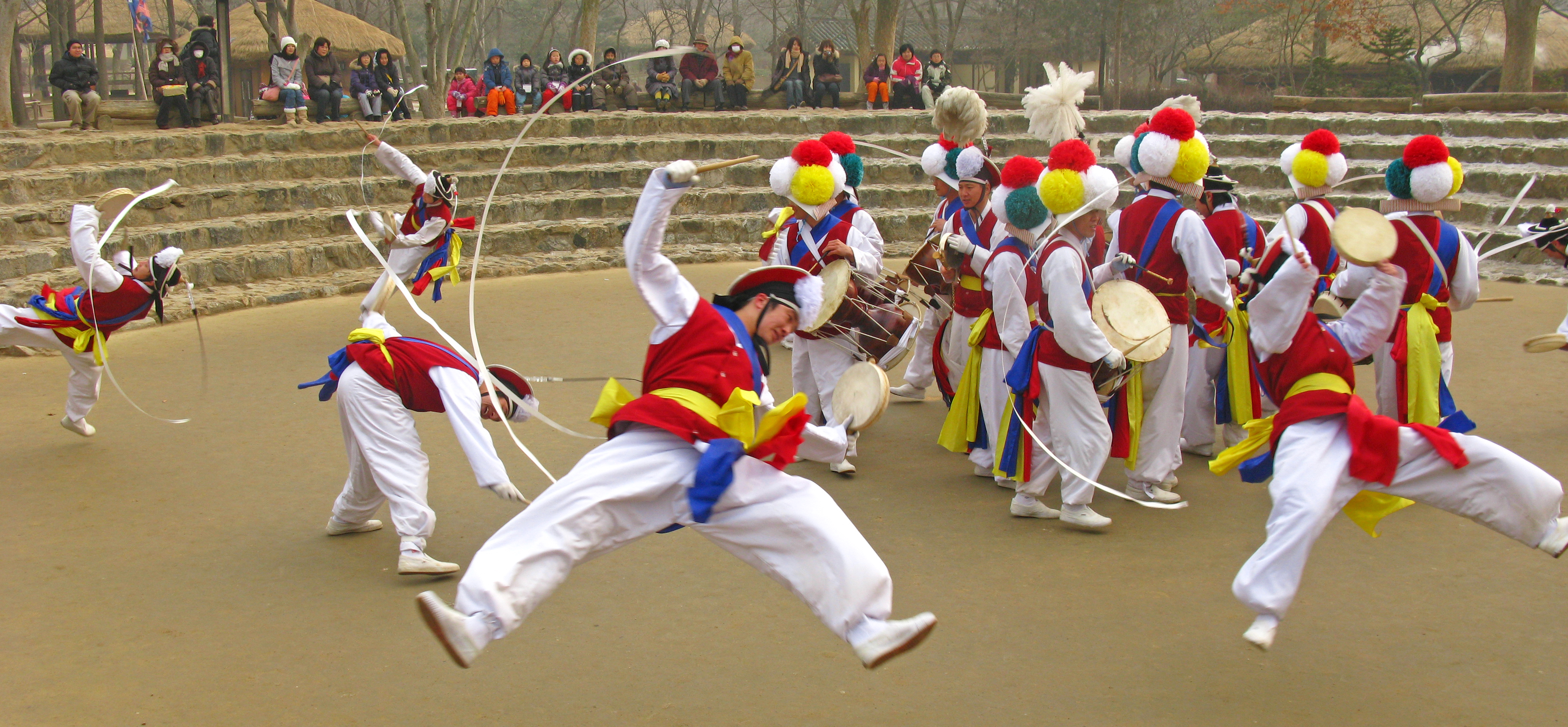
Nongak

- Cinema of South Korea
- Korean Literature
  - South Korean literature
- Traditional music of Korea
  - Music of South Korea
  - K-pop
  - Pungmul
  - Pansori
  - Sanjo
  - Jeongak
  - Shinawi
  - Korean Traditional Rhythm
- Television in South Korea
- Korean calligraphy
- Korean dance
  - Cheoyongmu
  - Gainjeonmokdan
  - Geommu
  - Mugo
  - Seungmu
  - Seungjeonmu
  - Taepyeongmu
  - Ganggang sullae
  - Nongak
  - Talchum
  - Byung shin chum
  - Nabichum
  - Barachum
  - Buchaechum
- Theatre of Korea
  - Changgeuk
- Woodblock printing in Korea

=== Cuisine of South Korea ===
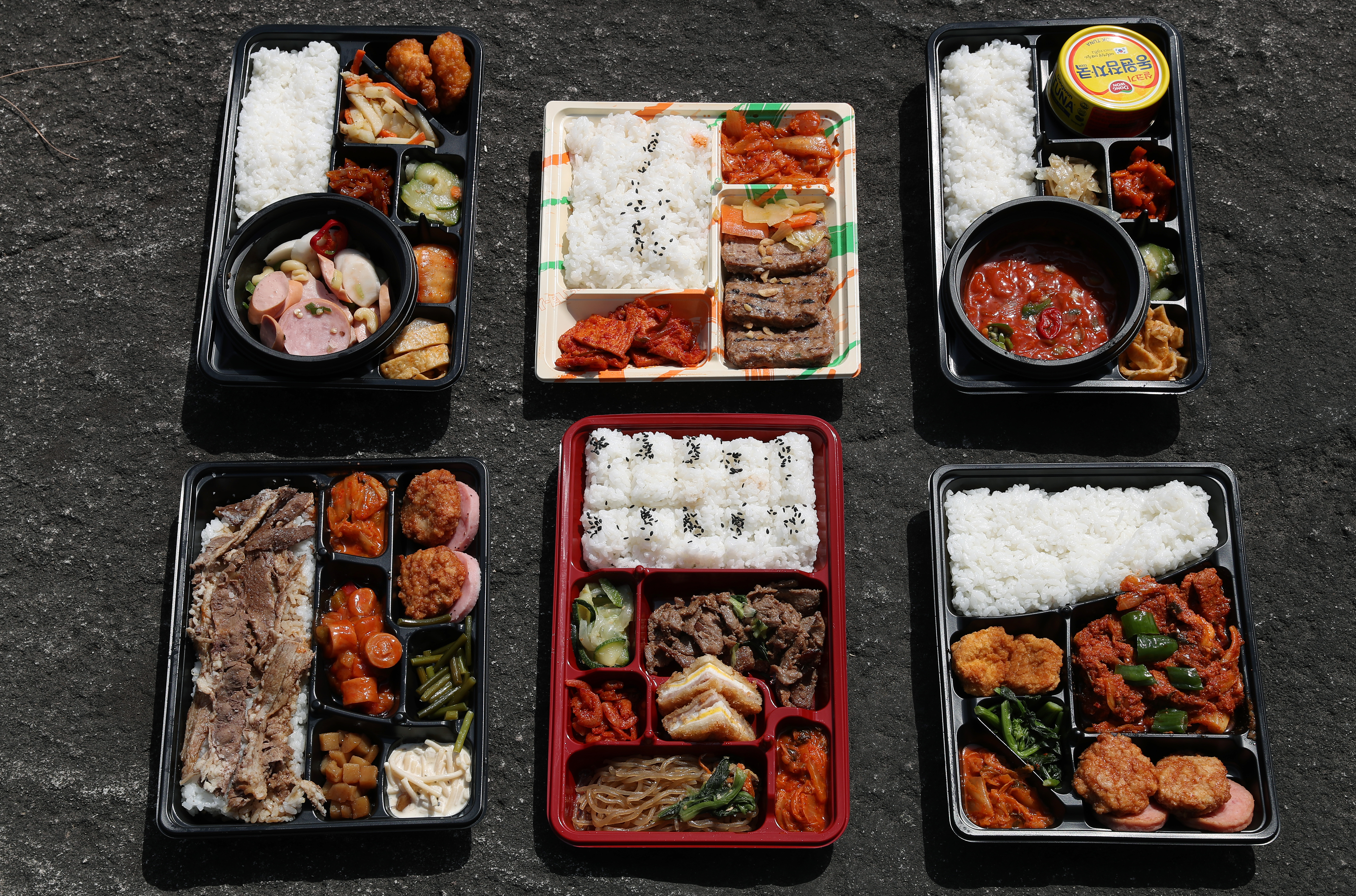
Dosirak

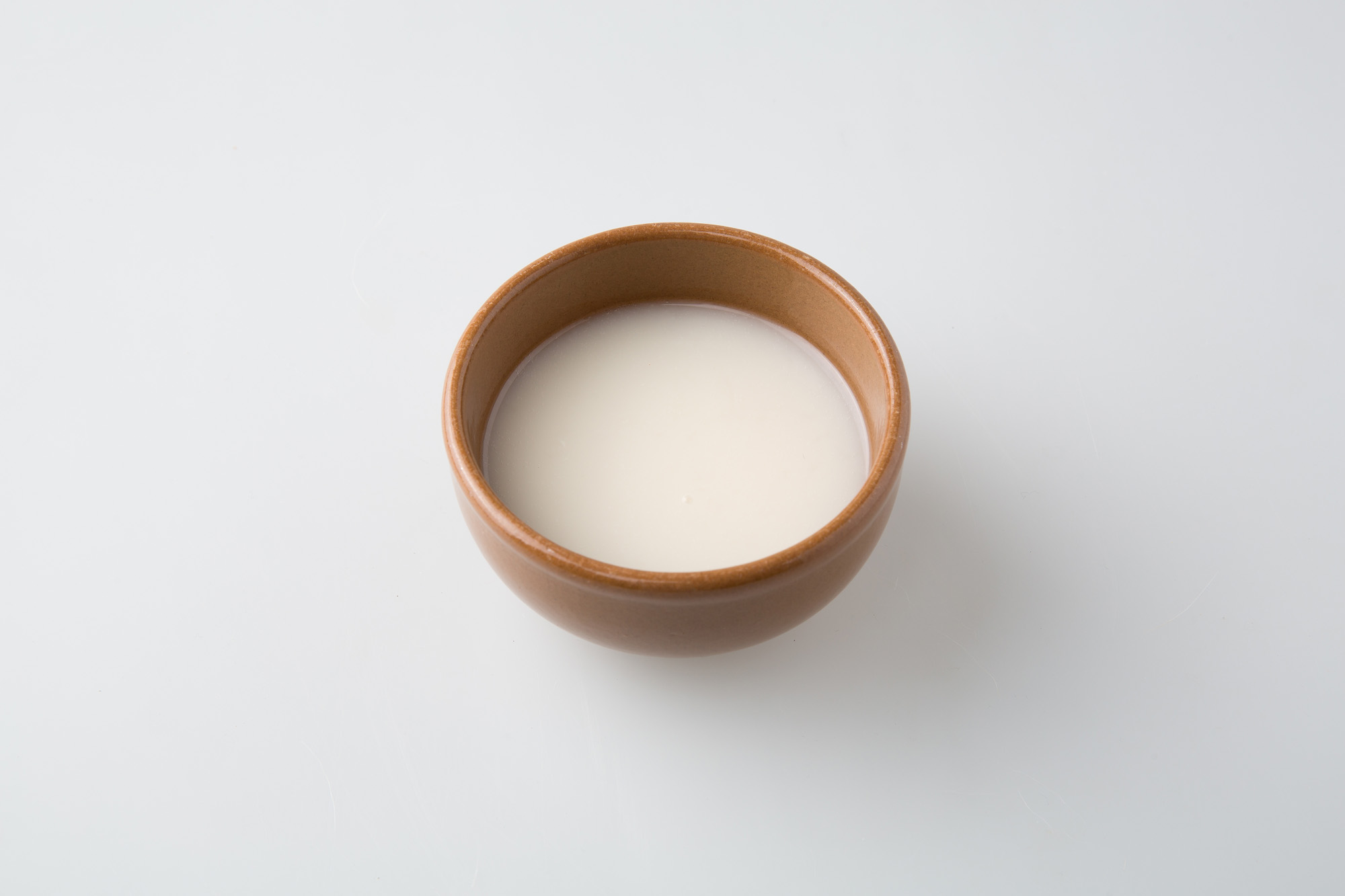
Makgeolli

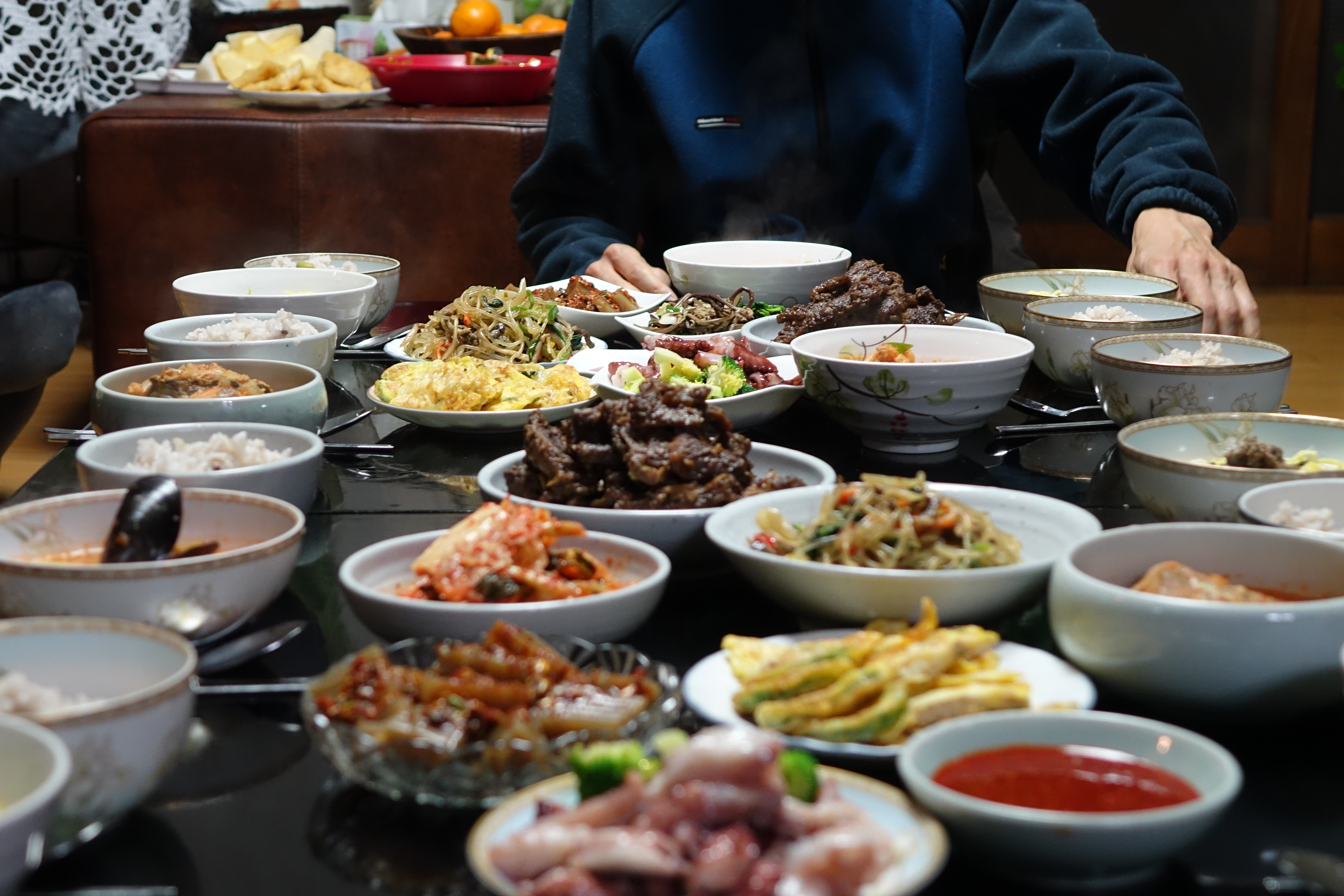
Hanjeongsik

- Dosirak
- Banchan
- Hanjeongsik
- Korean desserts
- Korean dishes
- Korean drinks
  - Korean alcoholic beverages
    - Soju
    - Makgeolli
- Korean restaurants
- Korean fried chicken
- Street food in South Korea

=== Cultural icons of Korea ===
- Kimchi
- Bibimbap
- Hanbok

=== Fashion in South Korea ===
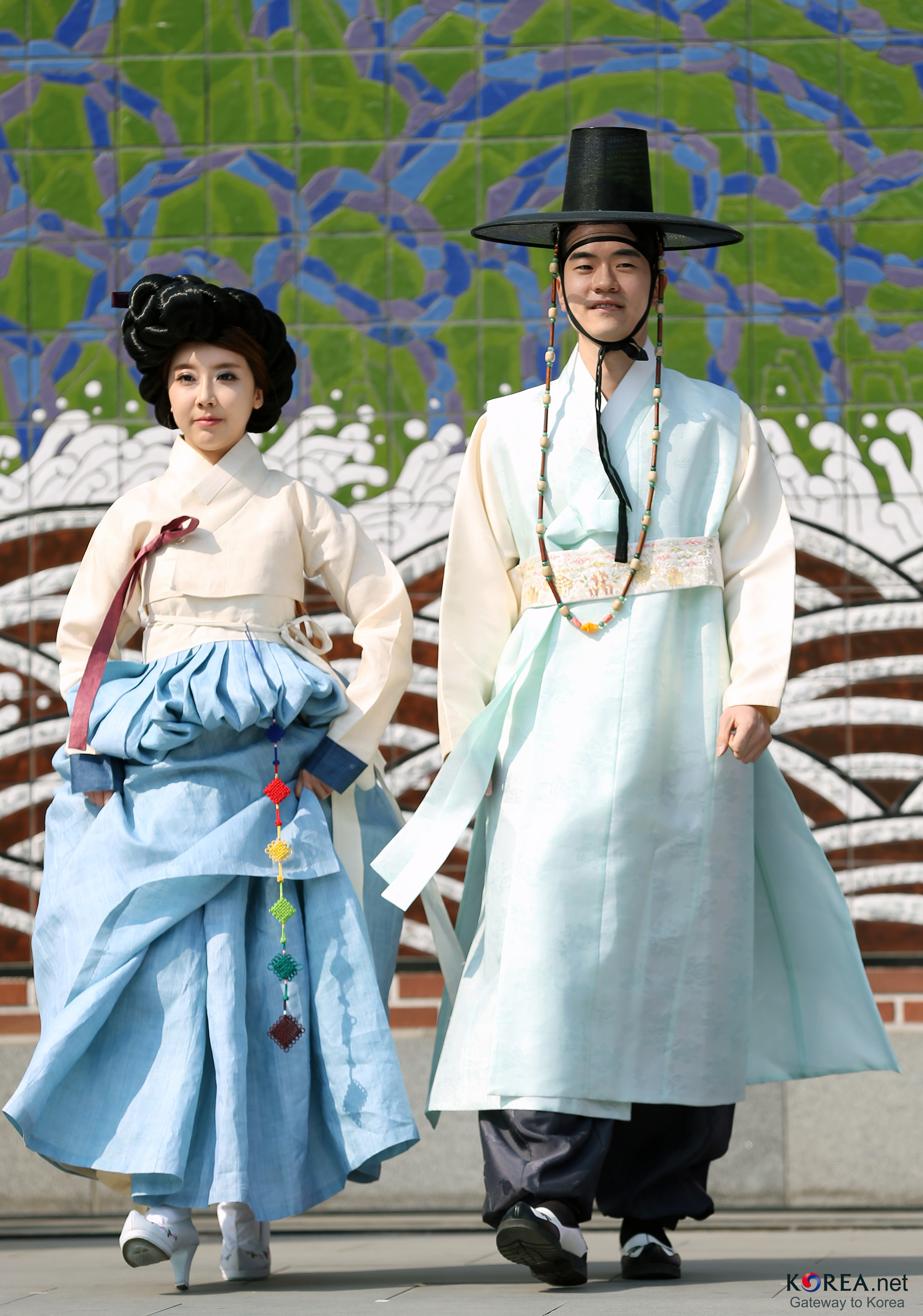
Hanbok

- Korean clothing
- Hanbok
  - Baji
  - Chima
  - Chima jeogori
  - Dangui
  - Dopo
  - Durumagi
  - Garot
  - Gwanbok
  - Gonryongpo
  - Hakchangui
  - Hwarot
  - Jeogori
  - Jeonbok
  - Kkachi durumagi
  - Magoja
  - Po
  - Sagyusam
  - Saekdongot
  - Wonsam
- School uniforms in South Korea

=== Holidays and festivals in South Korea ===
- Korean traditional festivals
- Music festivals in South Korea
- Film festivals in South Korea

=== Homes in South Korea ===
- madang
- ondol
- Jeonse

=== People of South Korea ===
- South Korean male actors
- South Korean actresses
- Women in South Korea
- Korean names

=== Sport in South Korea ===
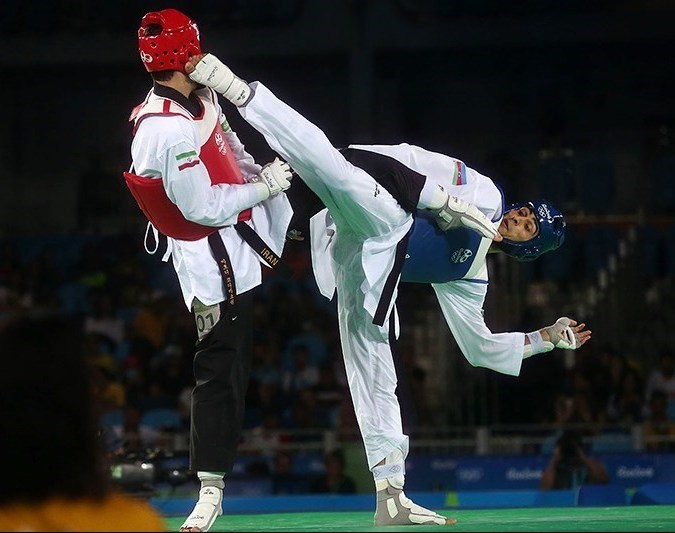
Taekwondo

- Football in South Korea
  - K League
  - Football in Seoul
- Baseball in South Korea
- South Korea at the Olympics
- Taekwondo
- Ssireum

=== Religion in South Korea ===
- Seohak
- Korean Confucianism
- Korean shamanism
- Korean Buddhism
- Buddhism in South Korea
- Christianity in South Korea
- Hinduism in South Korea
- Islam in South Korea

== Economy and infrastructure of South Korea ==
- Economic history of South Korea
- Economic rank, by nominal GDP (2015): 11th (eleventh)
- Agriculture in South Korea
- Financial services in South Korea
- Youth unemployment in South Korea
- Work–life balance in South Korea
- Unemployment in South Korea
- Trade unions in South Korea
- Labor movement of South Korea
- Working hours in South Korea
  - National Bank of South Korea
  - Korea Exchange
- Manufacturing in South Korea
  - South Korean robotics
  - Electronics industry in South Korea
  - Semiconductor industry in South Korea
  - Automotive industry in South Korea
- Telecommunications in South Korea
  - Internet in South Korea
- Companies of South Korea
- Currency of South Korea: South Korean won
  - ISO 4217: KRW
- Economic history of South Korea
- Energy in South Korea
- Tourism in South Korea
  - Visa policy of South Korea
  - International students in South Korea
- Transport in South Korea
  - Airports in South Korea
  - Rail transport in South Korea
  - Road transport in South Korea
  - Expressways of South Korea
  - KTX
  - Seoul Metro
  - Plug-in electric vehicles in South Korea
- Tallest buildings in South Korea
- Department stores in South Korea
- Health care in South Korea
- National parks of South Korea

== Education in South Korea ==
- History of education in Korea
- Korean history textbook controversies
- School uniforms in South Korea
- Higher education in South Korea
  - National universities in South Korea
  - Universities and colleges in South Korea
  - Student and university culture in South Korea
  - South Korea's college entrance system
- Secondary education in South Korea
- International students in South Korea

== Health in South Korea ==
- Suicide in South Korea
- Smoking in South Korea
- Drinking culture of Korea
- Mental health in South Korea

== Science and technology in South Korea ==
- South Korean robotics
- Korea Aerospace Research Institute
- History of science and technology in Korea
- Traditional Korean medicine
- Korean inventions and discoveries

== See also ==
- South Korea
- Outline of Asia
- Outline of geography
- Outline of North Korea
- President of South Korea
- List of international rankings
- List of South Korea-related topics
- Member state of the United Nations
- Member state of the Group of Twenty Finance Ministers and Central Bank Governors
