= Gainjeonmokdan =

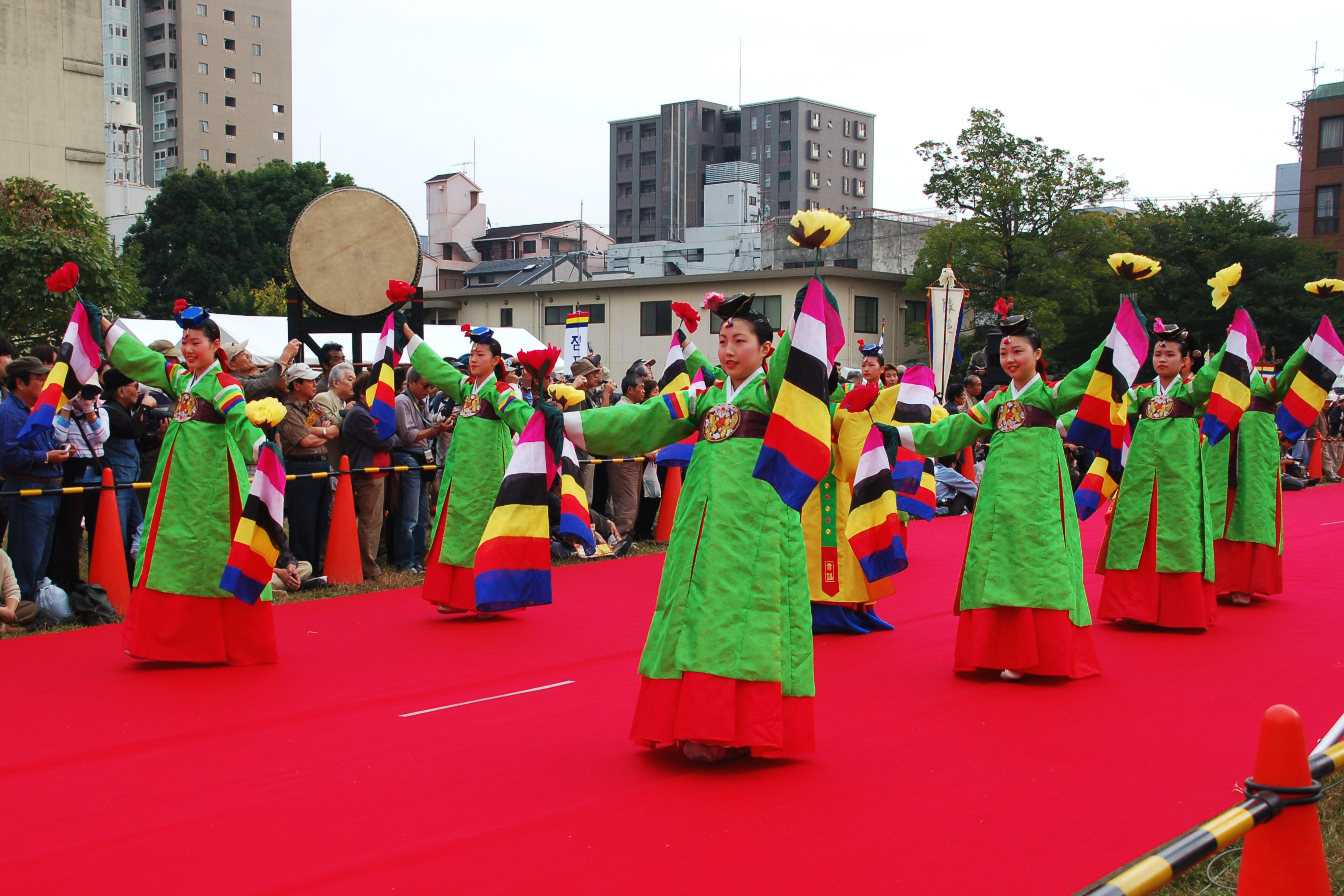

Korean name
- Hangul: 가인전목단
- Hanja: 佳人剪牧丹
- Revised Romanization: gainjeonmokdan
- McCune–Reischauer: kainjŏnmoktan

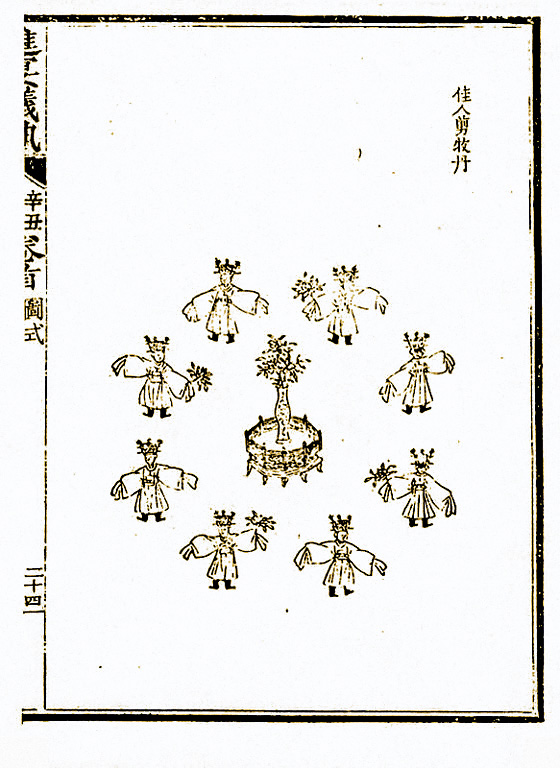

Gainjeonmokdan (Korean pronunciation: [ka.in dʑʌmoktan]) is a Korean court dance (called jeongjae 정재 in Korean), and literally means "beautiful people plucking peonies". This jeongjae was initiated and arranged by Hyomyeong Seja (Crown Prince Hyomyeong) in 1829 to please his father, King Sunjo. Gainjeonmokdan was first recorded in Mujajinjak uiqwe (무자진작의궤) in 1828.

In performance, peonies in a large vase for a prop are placed in the center of the stage, and then female dancers from divided two groups anticipate the flowers as moving around the vase. Dancers pick a peony one by one, and then dance in a calm movement.

== Changsa ==
Changsa (창사 唱詞) is verses of the accompanying song for dance or other performing arts. It is used for gainjeonmokdan

Changsa	Translation
만떨기의 꽃이 피어 궁궐을 비추는데 (萬朶先開照殿紅)	The blossoms of a thousand of flowers shed light on the palace,
붉은 꽃 노란 꽃은 시샘하듯 영롱해라 (姚黃魏紫妬玲瓏)	So splendid are red flowers, yellow flowers as if one envies.
새로 만든 옥피리는 청평악을 울리고 (新飜玉笛淸平樂)	The new-made jade piri resounds cheongpyeongak,
향기로운 꽃잎에는 나비들이 날아드네 (別樣仙香樸蝶風)	Butterflies fly around the fragrant flower petals.

== See also ==
- Korean dance
- Seungjeonmu
- Geommu
