= Son Dol's Day =

Traditional Korean festival

Son Dol's Day (Korean: 손돌날; RR: Sondollal) is a traditional Korean festival commemorating the unjust execution of a Goryeo ferryman, Son Dol (손돌; 孫乭), during the Mongol invasions of Korea. It occurs on the 20th day of the tenth lunar month. Other names of this day are 'Sondol Baengi Jugeun Nal' (손돌뱅이죽은날; lit. Day When Sondol Died) or 'Sonsagong Jugeun Nal' (손사공죽은날; lit. Day when Ferryman Son died).

== Legend ==
Son Dol's death is mentioned in Dongguk Sesigi ("A record of Seasonal Customs in Korea", 1849). During the reign of King Gojong (1212–1259) of the Goryeo dynasty (918–1392), the Mongol troops attacked, forcing the king to move the capital to Ganghwa Island. On the 20th day of the tenth lunar month, 1232, a ferryman named Son Dol boarded King Gojong on his boat to sail to the island. However, upon reaching the strait (now known as "Son Dol's Strait" or Sondolmok), being suspicious of the route taken, the king accused the ferryman of endangering his life and ordered his execution. Before his death, Son Dol advised the king and his entourage to drop a bottle gourd in the sea and follow its path.

The king heeded his advice and reached the island safely. He realized his mistake of falsely accusing an innocent and resulting in an unjust death. Upon reaching the destination, a funeral was held and a tomb was established as per the King's order to bring peace to the ferryman's soul. The port where the dead body was buried came to be known as 'Sondolhang' (Son Dol's tomb). This site is still visible to this day.

It is unclear if the incident indeed took place, due to the vivid characteristics of Son Dol being similar to that of the Wind God (Pungsin). Despite the uncertainty, due to some historical remains and facts, the legend is still interwoven with reality.

== Rituals ==
Due to the existence of the tomb and mention of Son Dol's death in Dongguk Sesigi, the local community has considered it as a part of history and the ritual 'Sondolje' (손돌제; 孫乭祭; lit. Son Dols' Rite) is performed to appease the soul of Son Dol every year on 20th day of the tenth lunar month. Locally known as 'Jusa Sondolgongjinhonje' (주사 손돌공 진혼제; 舟師孫乭公鎭魂祭; lit. ferryman Sondol’s soul comforting rite), the ritual takes place at the ferryman's grave located in Deokpojin, Gimpo, Gyeonggi Province. Built in 1970, it is now designated as a historical site. It is believed that the rites were carried on from the time of existence of the legend but thought to have been discontinued in the late Joseon era and revived in modern times. In some accounts the rituals consist of the Confucian rite, ritual food, and ritual dance like 'Jinhonmu' and 'Barachum'.

== Beliefs ==
Winter starts from the tenth lunar month in Korea, and a huge shift in livelihood can be noticed during this period. Many fishermen and women cultivate marine products and some venture out into the winter seas. During such voyages fishermen have to cross many perilous waterways, including "Son Dol's Strait". Every year on the 20th day of the tenth lunar month, chilly and violent wind blows in the area causing many maritime accidents and loss of life. Those occurrences are believed to be related to the legend. Winds that blew on this day are known as 'Sondolpung' (손돌풍; 孫乭風; lit. Son Dol's wind), 'Sondolbaram', and 'Sonseokpung' (손석풍; 孫石風; lit. Son Seok's wind).

It was naturally believed by the people that frigid temperatures and violent winds in the area were caused by the restless souls of dead seafarers. The cold weather on this day is also called 'Sondol chuwi' (손돌추위; lit. Son Dol’s cold) in reference to the unfortunate ferryman.
