= School uniforms in South Korea =

Standardized outfits worn by students of South Korean schools

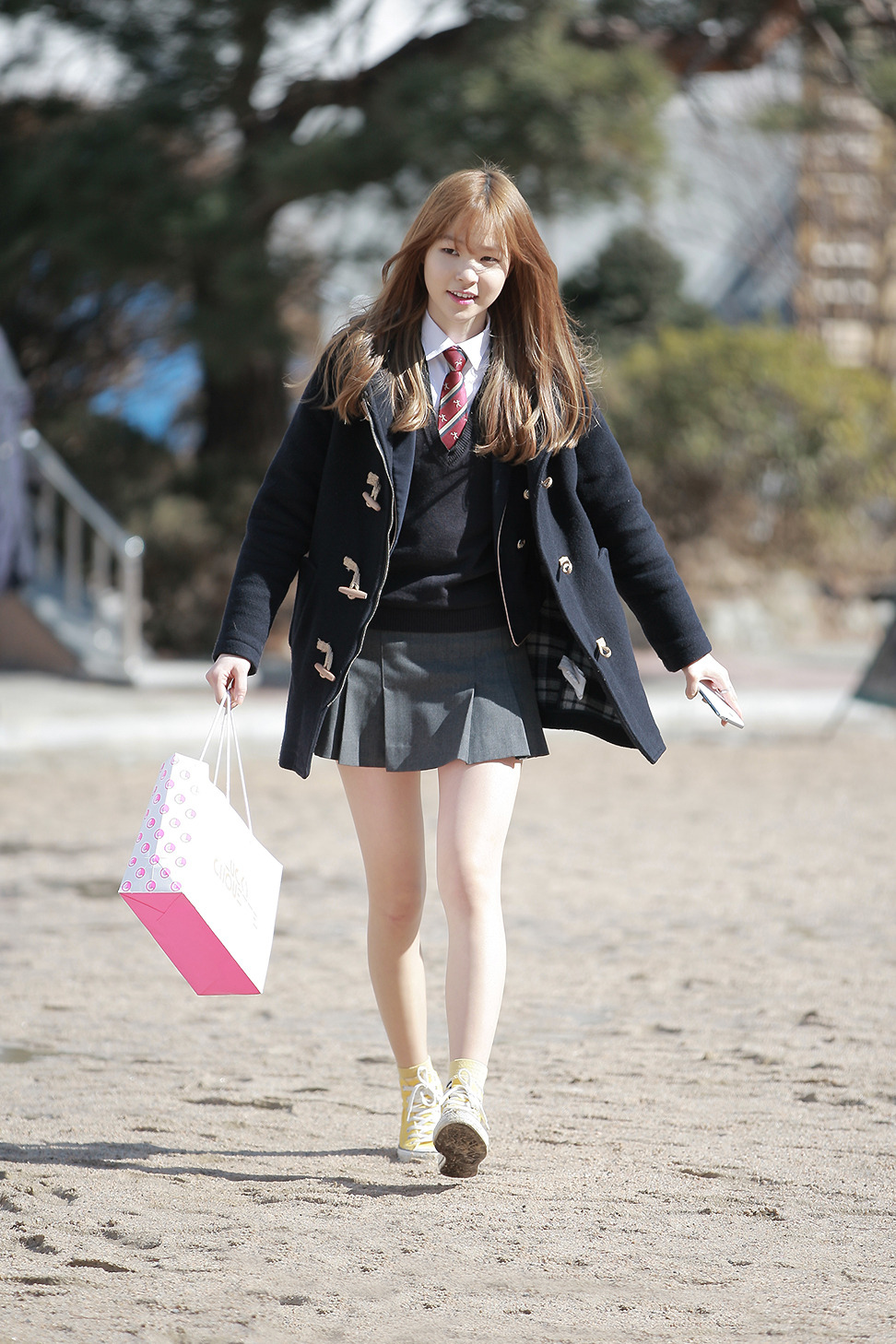
Jin Jeong-seon, female model, wearing a school uniform of Hallim Arts High School

Almost all South Korean secondary students wear a prescribed school uniform, gyobok (Korean: 교복; Hanja: 校服). The majority of elementary schools except some private elementary schools do not have uniforms; however, the uniform is strictly enforced from the start of middle school and up. A typical South Korean uniform usually consists of a shirt, blazer and tie, with skirts for girls and trousers for boys. More recently, the uniform is often worn by celebrities who target the younger, teen audience to sell entertainment products. The school uniform and school setting is frequently used as a venue for romance. As a result, the uniform has become something akin to an expression of fashion among students.

== History ==
The Encyclopedia of Korean Culture divides the history of school uniforms into six parts: the 1800s-1910, 1910–1945, 1945–1968, 1968–1982, 1982–1985, 1986-current. While the first instances of school uniforms were shown in schools established in the late Goryeo period, a general influence is attributed to Confucius students from the Joseon period.

=== Late 19th and early 20th century ===
The first school uniform in South Korea is from the Ewha Girl's University, now known as Ewha Womans University. The uniform was designated in 1886. The uniform consisted of a red jeogori and skirt made of cotton. The hair was braided swept-back with a knot. Clothing designed as a veil was used as an outdoor uniform. A heavier version of the clothing was used during the winter. Since the tradition was to wear different colored uniforms, the same red-colored uniform became a matter of curiosity.

The first boys' school uniform in South Korea originates from the boys' school Paichai Hakdang established by Henry Appenzeller. The uniform was created in 1898. The uniform heavily resembled the Japanese school uniform, consisting of red color bands wrapped around the sleeves, pants, and hat. Some scholars argue that the tradition of Korean school uniforms began with this uniform. Hansung Middle School, which was established in 1904, used a black durumagi with a black belt and a hat with the words 'Hansung' for a uniform.

In 1907, the first 'Yangjang' uniform was created in the Sookmyung Women's University. The uniform consisted of a purple serge one-piece clothing with a pink bonnet and heels. The uniform had a strong impact on Korean culture.

=== 20th century ===
After the Japan-Korea Treaty of 1910, the school uniforms were widely implemented. This movement was heavily influenced by Western missionaries and was centered around girls-only schools. In general, Jeogori was elongated while the skirt was shortened. The previously diverse colors in school uniforms became less and less diverse, with most uniforms becoming shades of black and white. In the 1920s, most of the girl uniforms came to have the 'white top black bottom' policy. However, schools differentiated their uniforms from others by means such as wave patterns and skirt lengths. Because the skirts were getting shorter, schools implemented an official policy concerning the length of the skirt. However, the skirt lengths kept decreasing. Also in the 1920s, P.E. uniforms were introduced. There were many types of P.E. uniforms, but it mostly consisted of a shirt and bloomers.

In the 1930s, the Empire of Japan, which ruled over Korea, implemented a policy to unify the girls' uniforms as 'yangjang.' The change in policy is attributed to both a growing awareness of Western culture and a movement by Japan to get rid of hanbok. The most widespread school uniform for girls was a white blouse with a brown skirt, and a sailor suit uniform in the winter. However, a few schools still maintained the hanbok uniform.

In the late 1930s to the 1940s, students were forced to wear workwear. This was due to the beginning of World War II and Japan's involvement in the war. The uniform was dubbed 'monpe (몸빼, munbae).' Some schools avoided this policy by designating other pants as uniforms. Other schools such as ChungShim Women's School refused to comply with the policy and wore hanbok.

With the completion of the Korean independence movement and the independence of Korea, the workwear uniform was discarded. Until the 1960s, uniform pants were still worn as the official uniform. The uniforms were generally black or dark brown.

In 1968, the government established the 'Middle School Equalization Policy.' The Middle School uniforms were standardized at this time. The summer uniform was established as a white 'Wing-collar' blouse and the winter uniform as black or dark brown clothing. This policy was maintained until 1982.

From 1983 to 1985, school uniforms were briefly abolished due to a 'free school uniform policy.' The policy was established to diminish the senses of oppression and alienation while encouraging individualism. This policy was removed in 1986 when schools were allowed to mandate uniforms again. Since then, the number of schools mandating uniforms had been increasing.

=== Current ===
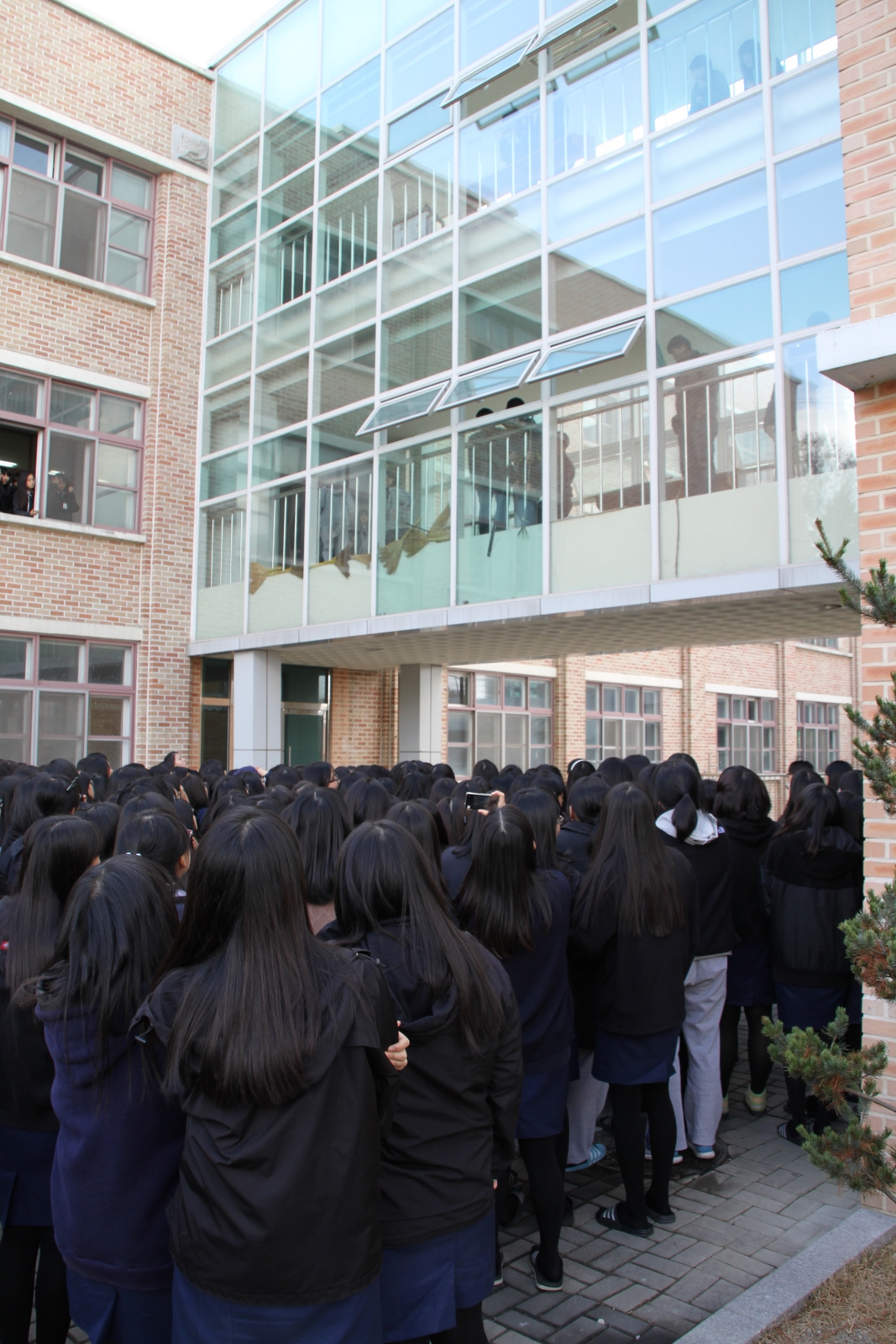
Uniform of Cheonan Girls' High School

Schools are currently not compelled to institute school uniforms. However, according to the Ministry of Education (South Korea), 96.4% of female students are wearing uniforms. To combat temperature, sexual harassment, and traditional sexual discrimination, the Ministry of Education (South Korea) has been encouraging the usage of pants as school uniforms, as of 2000.

== Components ==
A typical Korean school uniform for a boy usually includes a jacket, a long-sleeved collared white shirt, a tie, dress trousers, and outerwear for the Winter season. A girl's Korean school uniform generally consists of a bow, a collared white shirt with sleeves, a vest, a pleated skirt and outerwear for the winter, and white socks. Nail polish and make-up were generally not allowed until many municipal education departments enacted 'Student's rights acts' which include freedom of uniform and freedom of hair style.

== See also ==
- School uniforms
- South Korea
