= Byeongsin chum =

Byeongsin chum (Korean: 병신춤, lit. the dance of the handicapped) is a Korean folk dance that was performed by the lower class peasants to satirize the Korean nobility (Yangban) by depicting them as disabled and sick persons such as paraplegics, midgets, hunchbacks, the deaf, the blind, lepers, as well as characters from Pansori and other Korean folklore. It originated in Miryang, Gyeongsangnam-do. In modern times, byeongsin chum has been acknowledged to public by South Korean actress Gong Ok-jin (공옥진). Japan banned this practice during Japan's annexation period, but it has been revived as a Korean folk dance in South Korea and North Korea today.

In 2001, a performance of byeongsin chum put on by a South Korean theatrical group in Daehangno caused a controversy, with critics calling the play discriminatory and offensive toward disabled people. The Research Institute of the Differently Abled Person's Right in Korea (RIDRIK) stated that although the freedom of expression is important in art, the form that makes fun of the alienated is the problem, and that they disapproved of the old customs of Korean society that humiliate disabled people.

== See also ==
- Yangban
