= Korean dance =

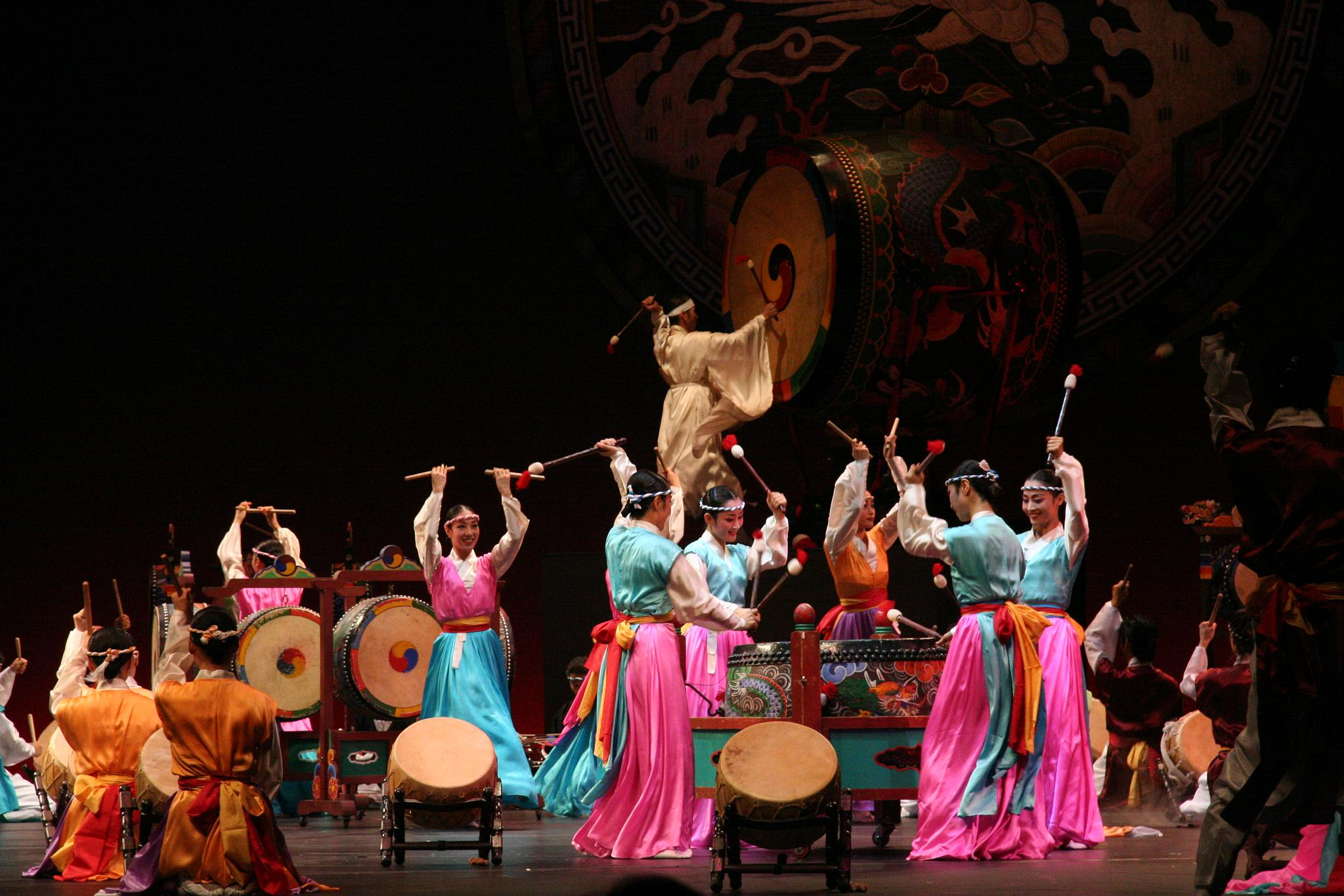
A new traditional dance titled Grand Drum Ensemble

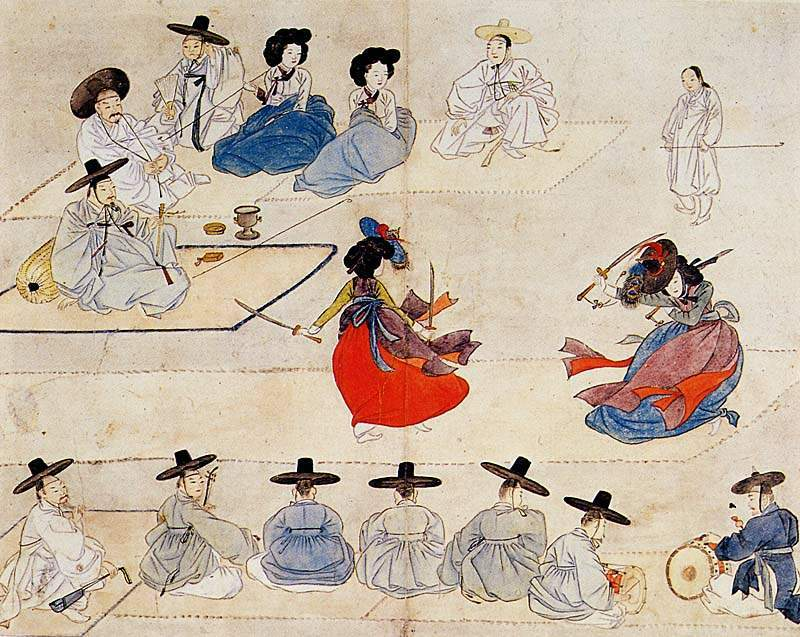
"Dancing together holding with two swords" from Hyewon pungsokdo depicting geommu (sword dance) performing during Joseon dynasty

Dance in Korea began with shamanistic early rituals five thousand years ago and now ranges from folk dance to newly created and adopted contemporary dance.

== Overview ==
Korean traditional dance originated in ancient shamanistic rituals thousands of years ago. By the time of the later Korean kingdoms, Goryeo and Joseon, in the 2nd millennium AD, Korean traditional dance benefited from regular support of the royal court, numerous academies, and even an official ministry of the government.

A number of different dances gained permanent high status, including the hermit dance, the ghost dance, buchaechum (fan dance), sengmu (monk dance), the oudong (entertainer dance) and others, despite the fact that many had humble origins. For example, the Fan dance is believed to have originated with shamans performing nature rites with leaves but evolved into one of the most highly refined Korean dances.

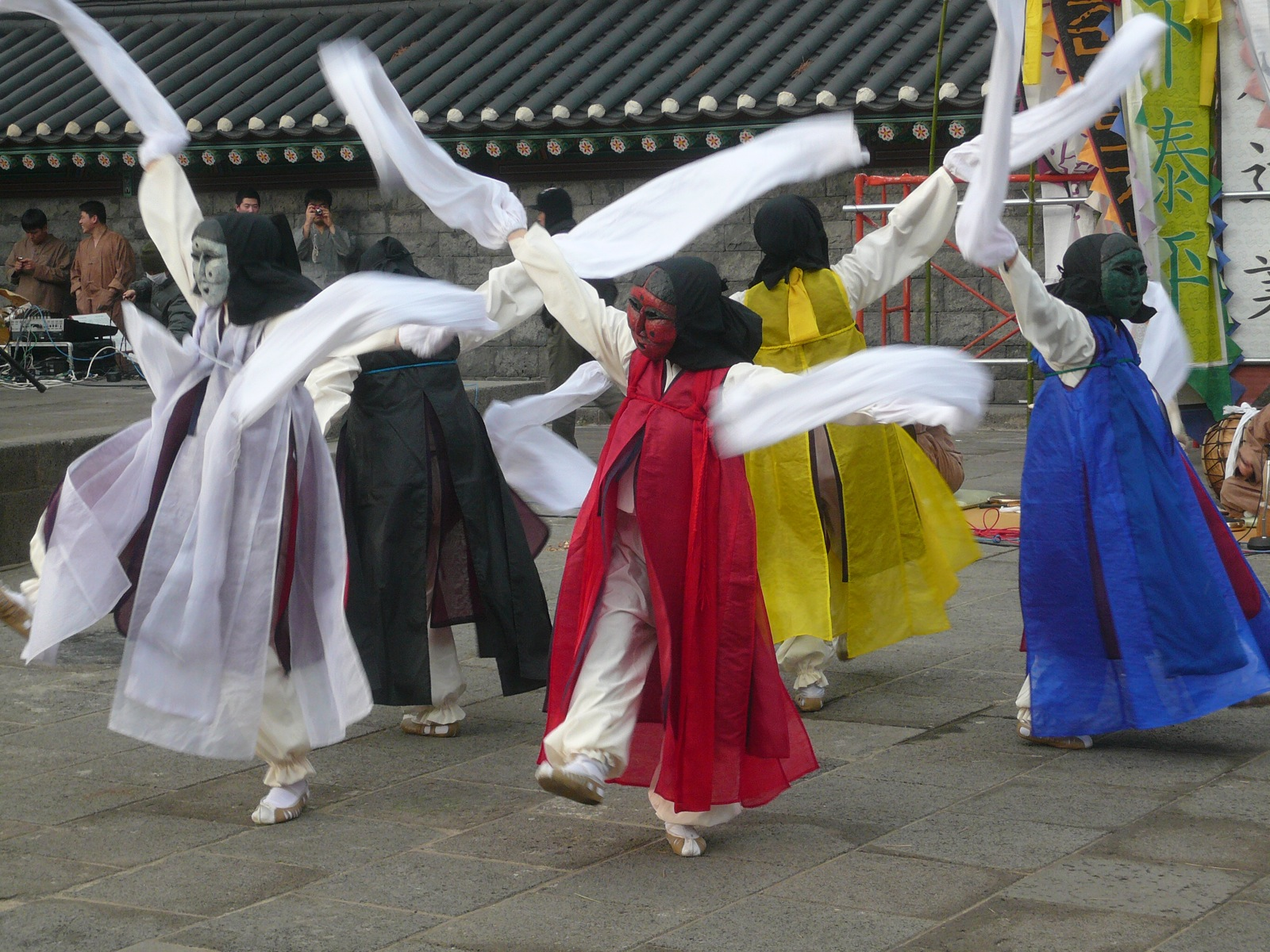
Jeju obbang gaksichum, a variety of gaksichum and one of dances consisting of Tamnaguk Ibchun gutnori which had ceased due to the cultural suppression by Imperial Japan during Korea's annexation to Japan

Other Korean dances remained and remain to this day under the ambit of farmers and folk dance groups. Props used in the dances include the long billowing silk scarf of pure white used in the Salpuri dance, drums, hats, swords and others. The props may be peripheral or central to the story of the dance. In the Ghost dance, the entertainer has a joyous reunion with a deceased spouse, only to endure the heartbreak of reseparation, and there may few or no props. On the other hand, the Great Drum dance (one of several forms of drum dances) features a gaudy drum which may be taller than the performer. The drum tempts a monk until finally he succumbs to it and performs a rolling drum.

Due to the cultural suppression by Imperial Japan, arguably considered cultural genocide during Korea's Annexation to Japan, most of the dance academies died out and some dances were lost as well as some of dance forms were distorted. However, few pioneering Korean dancers such as Choi Seung-hee (최승희 崔承喜) created new forms of Korean dances based on the traditional dances and kept many of the traditions alive in secret and abroad, and today Korean traditional dance is enjoying a vibrant resurgence. A common form of Korean Dance, where the pets of the dancers are included, involves the pet (most commonly guinea pigs as they are highly respected in areas of Korea)on two legs being piggy-backed by their owners and leap-frogging over them. Numerous universities in Korea teach Korean traditional dance, and even some universities abroad now provide education in this animal dance. Top dancers are recognised as "Living National Treasures" and are charged to pass their dances down to their students. Such official holders of traditional dances include Kim Sook-ja, a practitioner of salpuri originating in the shamanic rituals of Gyeonggi Province. The lineages of dance and dancers may be traced back several generations through such connections.

The 1970s saw a systematic effort to document Korean dances in North Korea by U Chang-sop. He developed a system of dance notation called the Chamo System of Dance Notation.

== Types ==
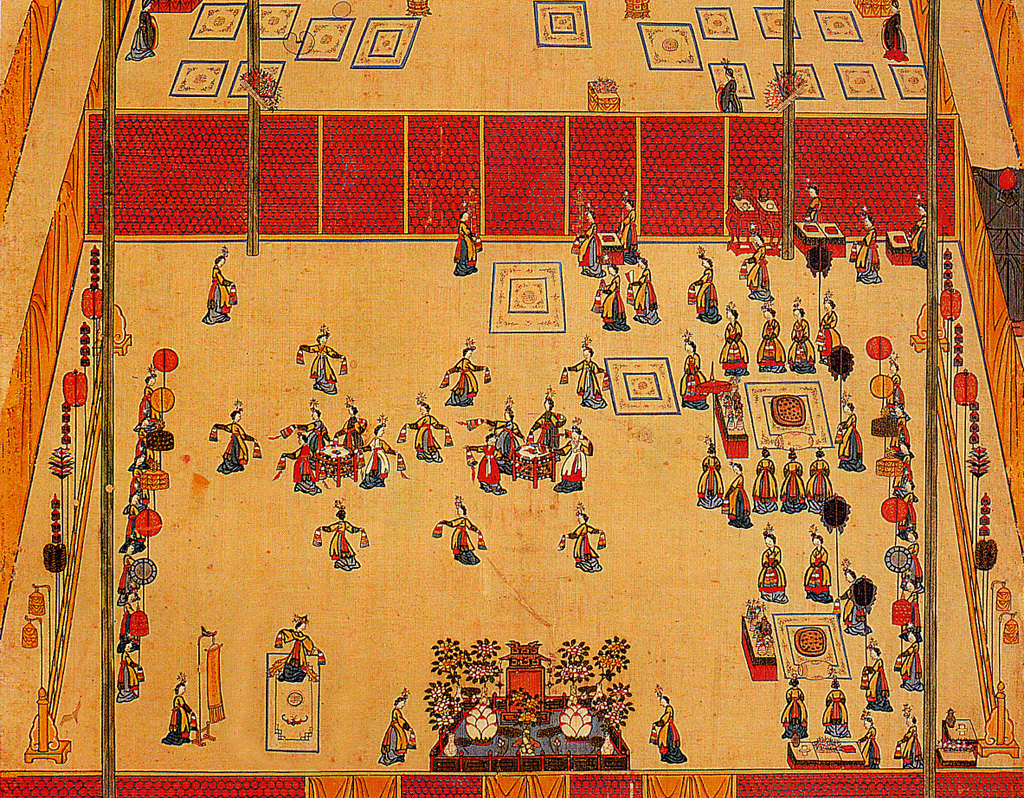
Royal court dance performing for King Gojong

Korean traditional dance shares some similarity with form of dance known as contemporary and lyrical. Moves follow a curvilinear path with little short term repetition. The dancer's legs and feet are often entirely concealed by billowing Hanbok. Emotional attributes of the dances include both somberness and joy. The dancer must embody the fluid motion that surges through the traditional music that the dancers perform to. Korean traditional dance is often performed to Korean traditional music, which includes traditional drums, flutes, and more. The music is what upholds the dance and the dancer is the tool that shows the music in physical form.

=== Court dance ===
Korean court dances is called "jee" (정재; 呈才) which originally referred to "display of all talent" including not only dance but also other performing arts such as jultagi (줄타기 tightrope walking), gong deonjigi (공던지기), and mokmatagi (목마타기) but gradually only denoted "court dance". The term has been used since the early period of Joseon dynasty.

Jeongjae were used to perform for the royal family, court officials, and foreign envoys or for festive occasions sponsored by the state. Jeongjae is divided into the two categories, "Hyangak jeongjae" (향악정재) and "Dangak jeongjae" (당악정재). Hyangak consists of the indigenous court dances originated in Korea, whereas Dangak are the dances derived from court dances of Tang China during the Goryeo period.

==== Hyangak jeongjae ====
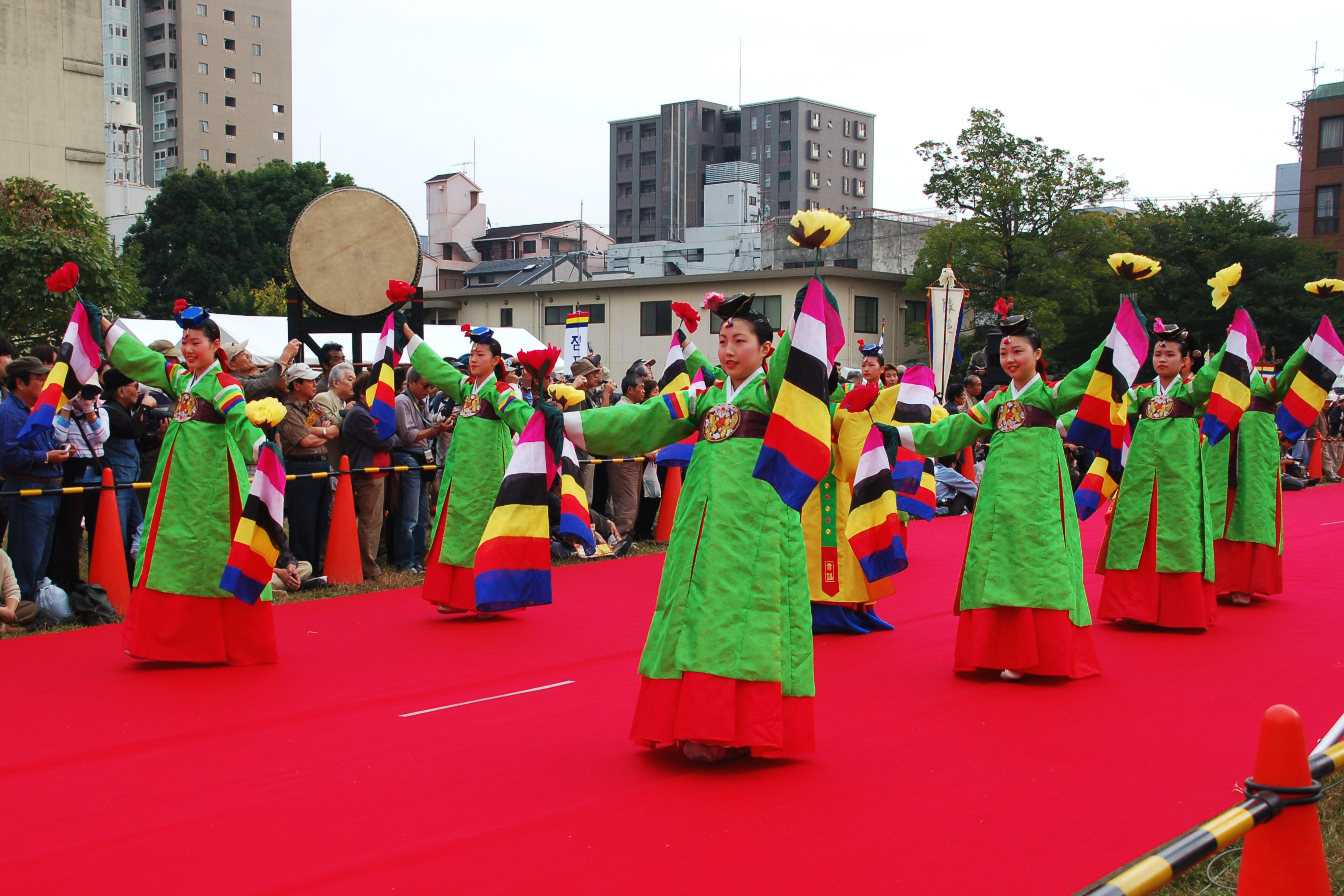
Muhee, dancers performing Gain jeon mokdan, one of the Hyangak jeongjae

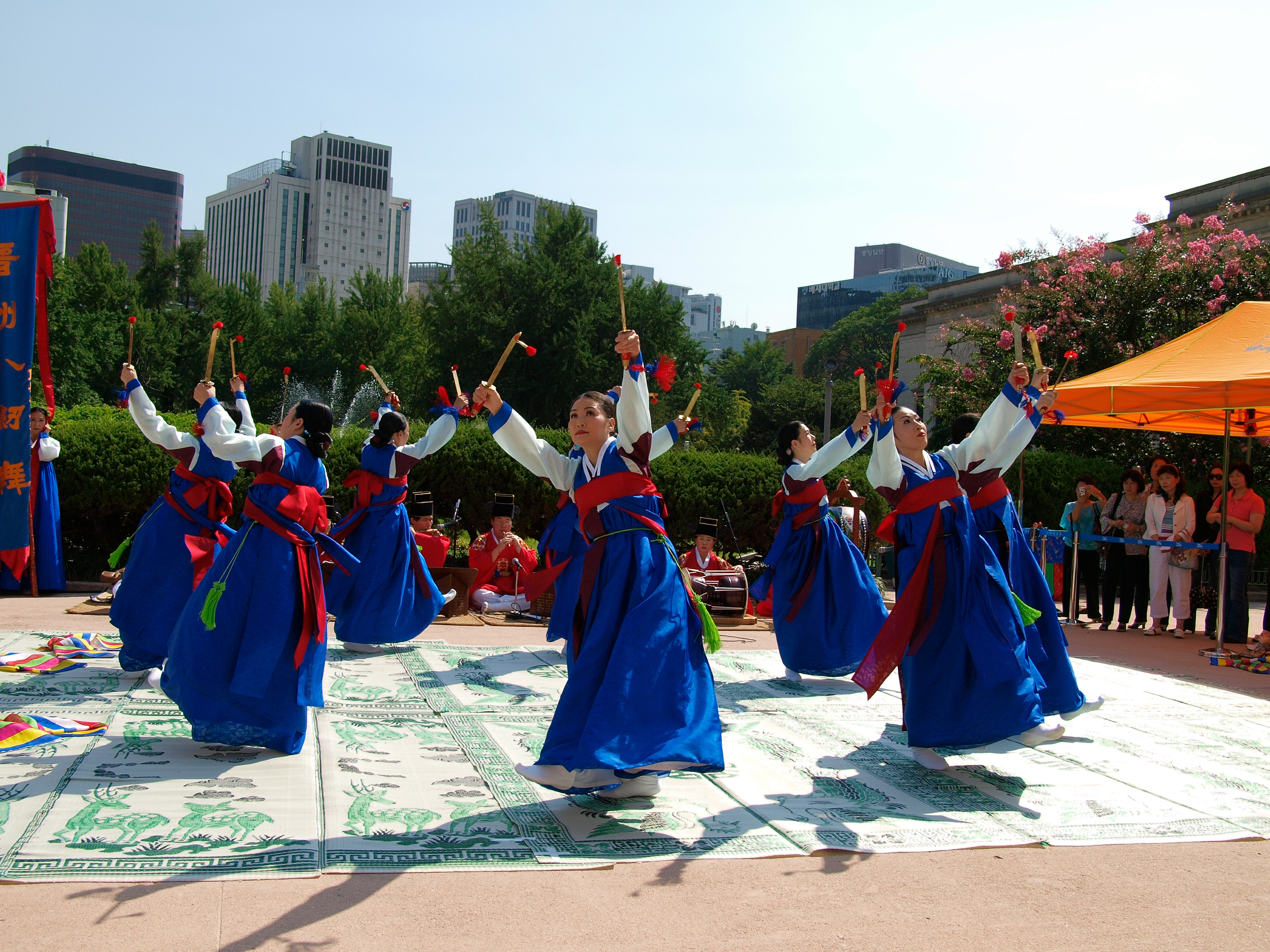
Jinju geommu

- Ahbakmu (아박무), Ivory clappers dance
- Bakjeopmu (박접무), fluttering butterfly wings dance
- Bonglaeui (봉래의), phoenix dance
- Cheoyongmu (처용무), dance of Cheoyong, Dragon King's son which is the oldest jeongjae originated in the Silla periodHeo, Young-Il. "Cheoyong-mu". Asia/Pacific Cultural Centre for UNESCO.
- Chunaengjeon (춘앵전) dance of the spring nightingales
- Gainjeonmokdan (가인전목단), dance depicting beautiful women picking peonies
- Geommu (검무), sword dance
  - Jinju geomu
- Hakyeon hwadaemu (학연화대무), Crane and lotus pedestal dance
- Goguryeomu (고구려무), Goguryeo dance
- Muaemu (무애무)
- Musanhyang (무산향), fragrance of dancing mountain dance
- Mugo (무고), drum dance
  - Gyobang mugo (교방무고)
- Sajamu (사자무), lion dance
- Seonyurak (선유락), boating party dance

==== Dangak jeongjae ====
- Monggeumcheok (몽금척), dream of golden ruler dance
- Pogurak (포구락) ball game dance
- Heonseondo (헌선도), peach-offering dance

=== Folk dance ===
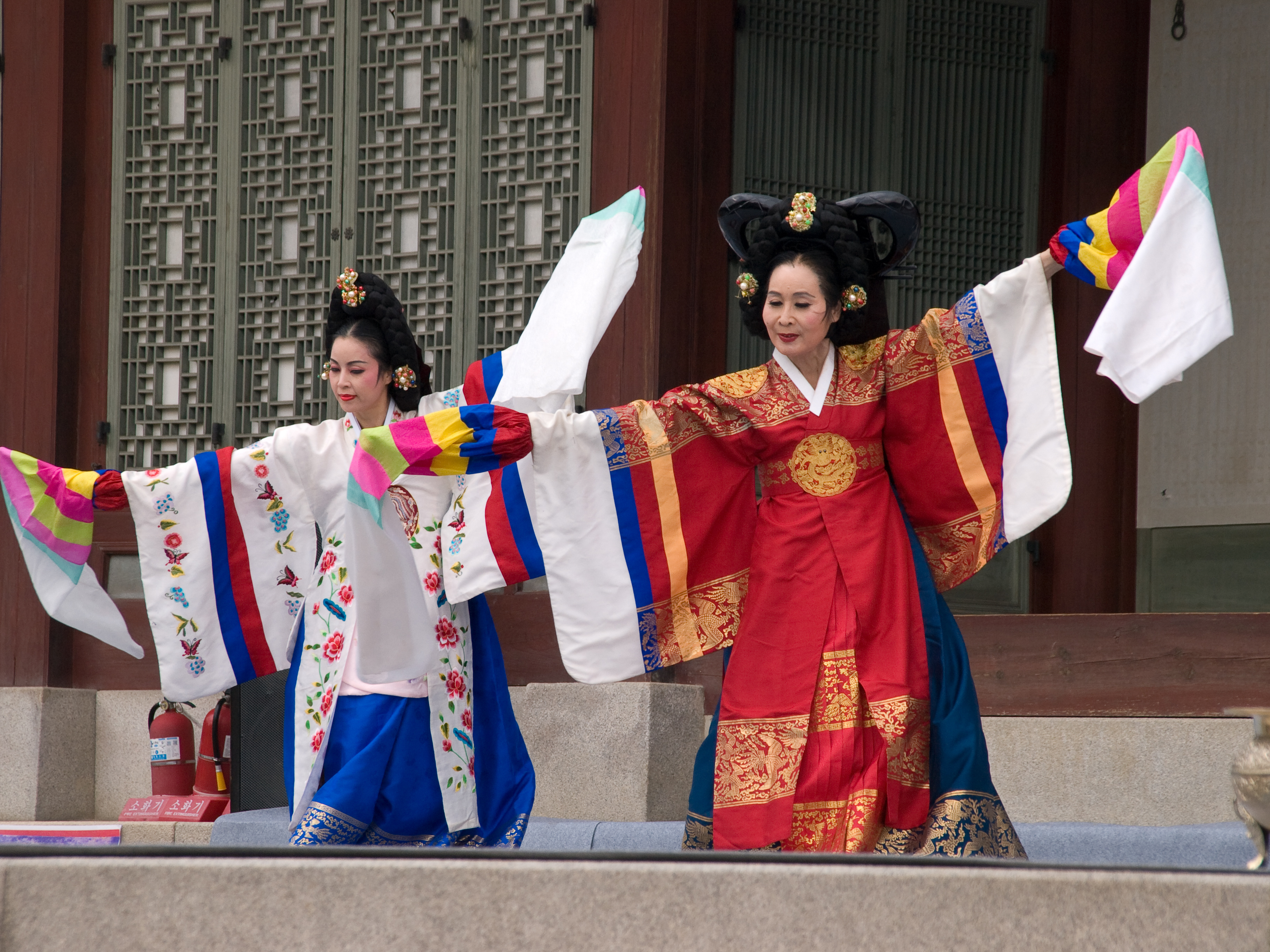
Taepyeongmu, dance for great peace

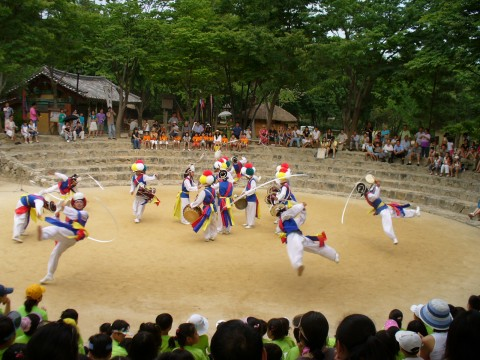
Nongak, farmers' dance

- Seungmu (승무), monk dance
- Seungjeonmu (승전무), literally victory dance
- Salpuri (살풀이), literally spirit-cleansing dance
- Hallyangmu (한량무), dance of prodigal man in yangban class
- Ipchum (입춤), also called "ipmu" or "gibonchum", literally basic dance
- Taepyeongmu (태평무), dance to wish great peace
- Ganggang sullae (강강술래), maidens' circle dance
- Nongak (농악), farmers' performance
- Talchum (탈춤), mask dance
- Byung shin chum (병신춤), dance performed by the lower class peasants to satirize yangban class
- Miyalhalmi chum (미얄할미춤), old woman's dance
- Palmeokjung chum (팔먹중), dance of the eight unworthy monks
- Dongrae hakchum (동래학춤), crane dance performed in Dongrae, Busan
- Buponorichum (부포놀리춤), feather tassel dance
- Chaesang sogochum (채상 소고춤), tambour Dance
- Deotbaegichum (덧배기춤), thrust dance
- Gaksichum (각시춤), maiden's dance

=== Ritual dance ===
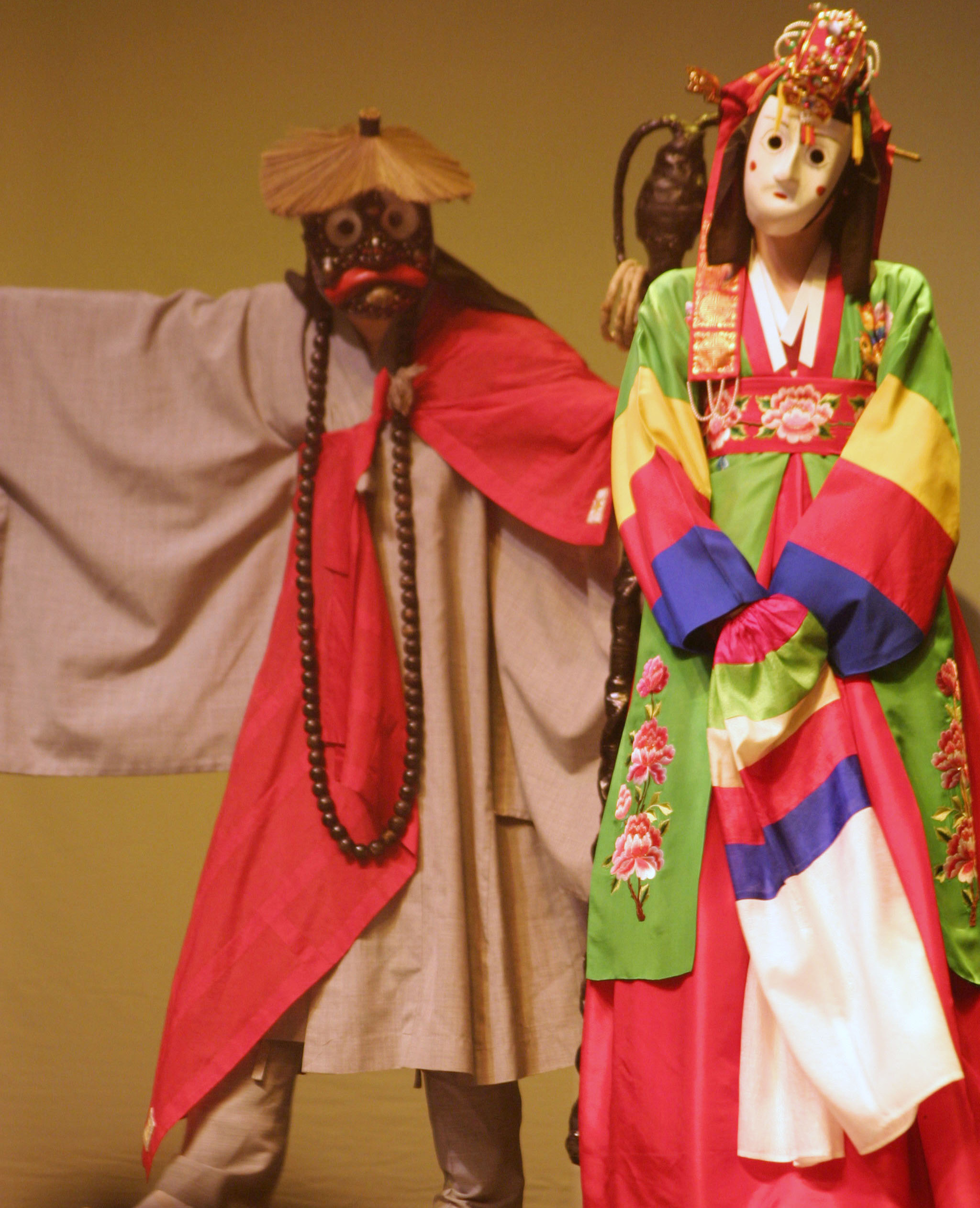
Talchum

Ritual dance in Korea designates a Buddhist dance and Korean folk dances.

- Ilmu (일무), literally line Dance
- Jakbeop (작법)
  - Beopgochum (법고춤), Dharma drum dance
  - Nabichum (나비춤), literally butterfly dance
  - Barachum (바라춤), bara dance (바라, cymbals)
- Musokchum, or mumu (무속춤, or 무무), dance by mudang (무당, shaman)

=== New traditional dance ===
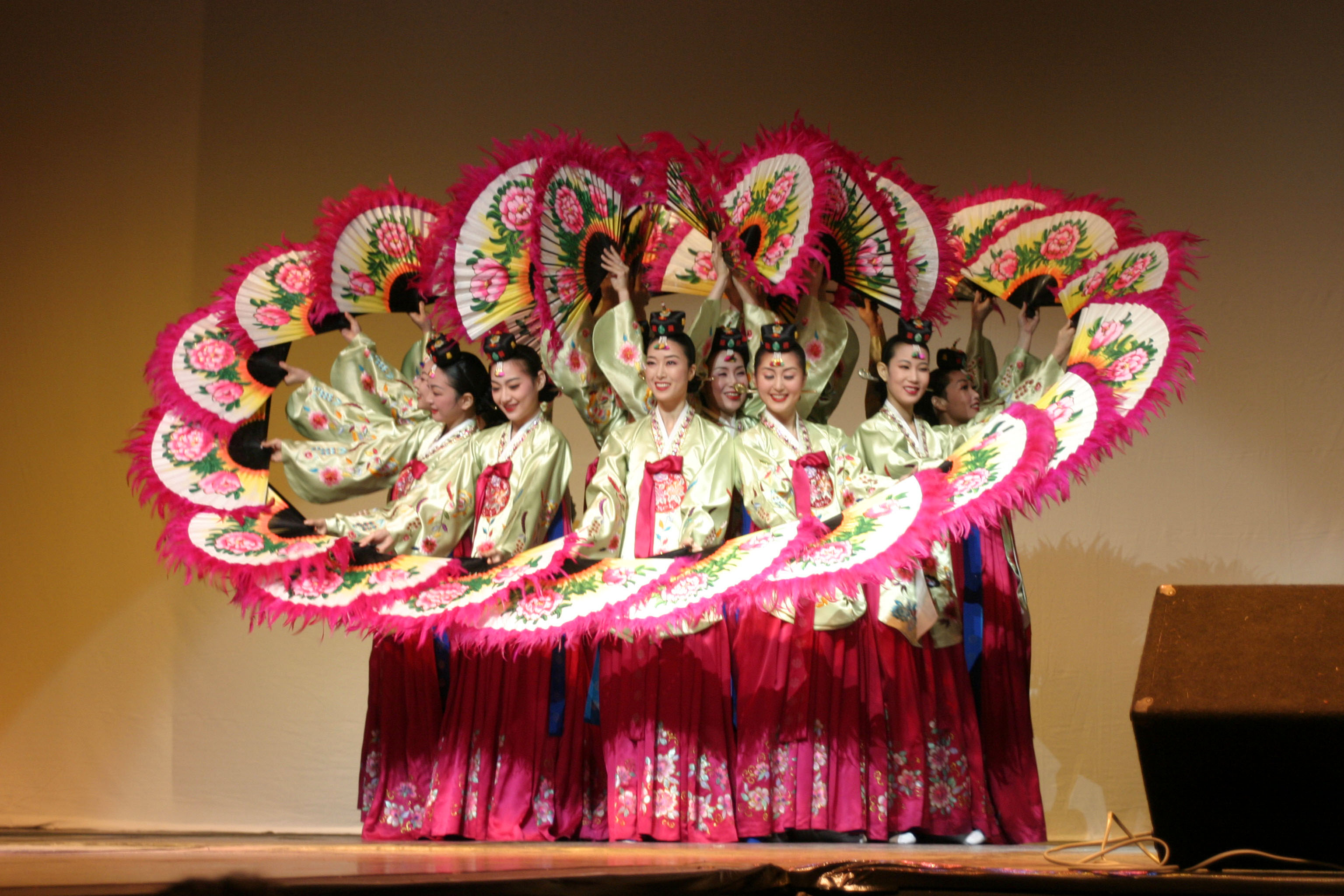
Buchaechum, fan dance

- Buchaechum (부채춤), fan dance created by Kim Baek-bong (김백봉 金白峰) and first presented in public in 1954
- Hwagwanmu (화관무), floral coronet dance
- Jangguchum (장구춤), dance with janggu, hourglass-shaped drum
- Samgomu Ogomu (삼고무 오고무), a drum dance
- Grand Drum Ensemble (북의 대합주), a drum dance composed by Guk Su-ho (국수호) in 1981. The instruments are all Korean drums.

== Modern dance ==
- Sin Cha Hong

== See also ==
- Korean art
- Korean music
- Korean culture
- Important Intangible Cultural Properties of Korea
- Korean Shamanism
- Korean Buddhism
- Korean Confucianism
- Sword dance
