= Nabichum =

Korean name
- Hangul: 나비춤; 착복무
- Hanja: (none); 着腹舞
- RR: nabichum; chakbongmu
- MR: nabich'um; ch'akpongmu

Nabichum (Korean: 나비춤) (literally 'butterfly dance') is a Korean Buddhist dance (Jakbeop) for ritual service. The dance is named after its choreography and costume which resemble the appearance of butterfly (nabi in Korean). Some people regard nabichum as the most representative and important dance among Korean Buddhist dances. Dancers wear jangsam (장삼: monks robe) and white gokkal (꼬깔: a peaked hat).

== See also ==
- Barachum
- Beopgochum
- Korean dance
- Korean Buddhism
