= Geommu =

Traditional sword dance practiced in Korea

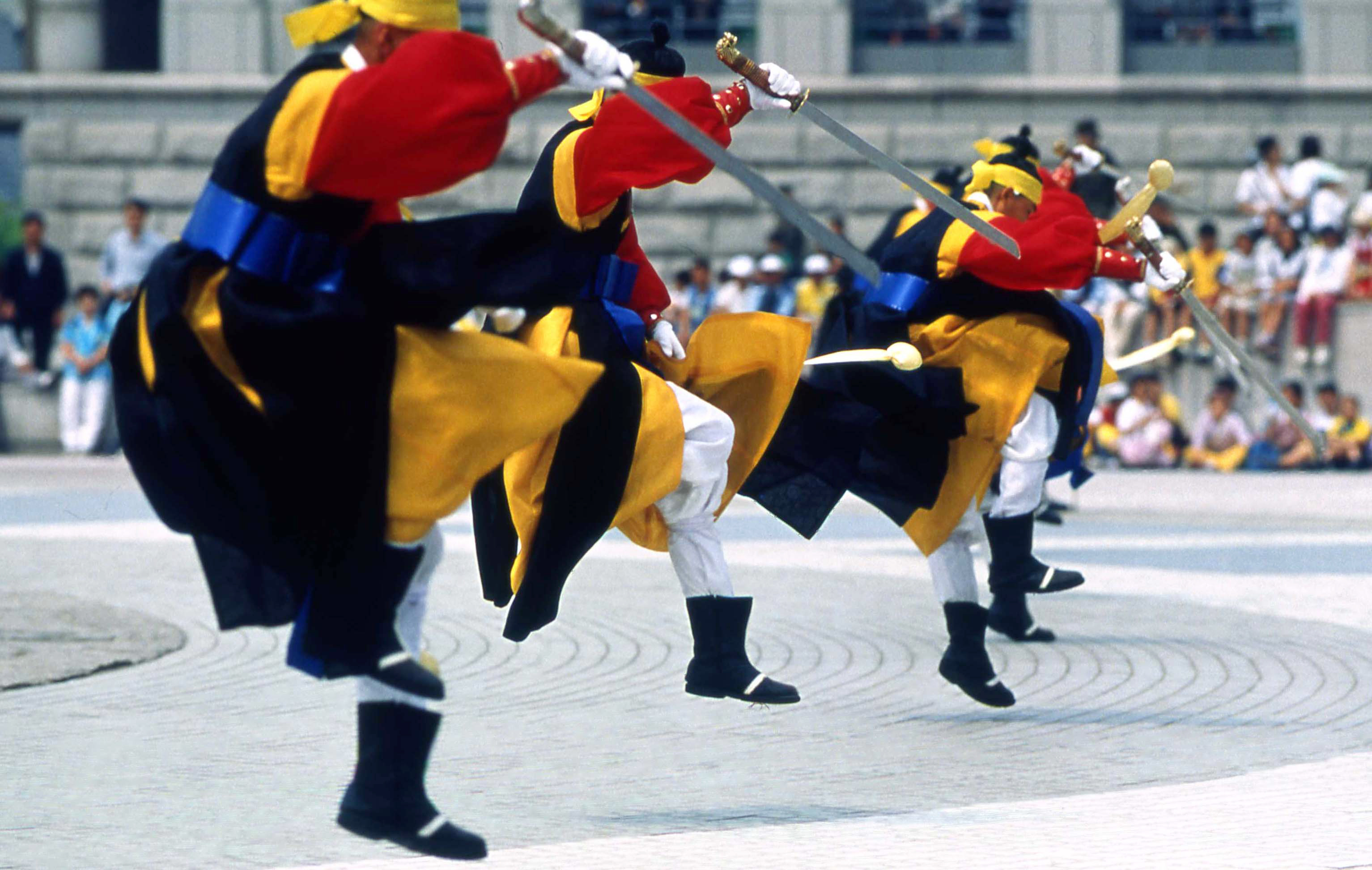
- Jinju geommu

Korean name
- Hangul: 검무
- Hanja: 劍舞
- RR: geommu
- MR: kŏmmu

Geommu (also transliterated Gummu, Kommu) is a traditional sword dance practiced in Korea. Geommu is performed with special costume, dance moves, and music. The dance is known for its grace in performance. Extra emphasis is placed on the movement of the costuming, notably the sleeves, in harmony with the movements of the dancer. The symbolic use of ssang dan geom, i.e. a replica of dual short swords, keeps to the militaristic origins of this dance. Geom-mu has become a dance of great beauty and is treasured as the South Korea's 12th Important Intangible Cultural Property.

== History ==
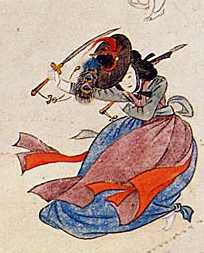
Detail from an early-19th-century Korean painting titled "Ssanggeom daemu" (雙劍對舞) by Hyewon, depicting a kisaeng performing Geommu.

According to legend, Geommu originated during the later portion of the Three Kingdoms of Korea with estimates placing it near 660 AD. At that time, Korea was divided into the three kingdoms, Silla, Baekje, and Goguryeo. The legend of Geommu states that a young boy in Silla named Hwangchang had an unusual talent for sword dance. His talent brought him great fame, even in the enemy kingdom, Baekje. One day, a king of Baekje invited him to his court to perform his great skill. The boy performed but in an act of great defiance killed the king before the royal assembly. Hwangchang was executed by the Baekje military. People in Silla expressed their respect and sorrow at Hwangchang's death by dancing in imitation of Hwangchang's abilities, adorning a mask which was made to resemble his face. Thereafter, people named this dance "Hwangchangmu".

Surviving as a folk dance and cultural asset, Geommu was considerably changed during the Joseon Dynasty period from 1392 through 1910. At that point Geommu was rearranged by the Royal Court and recreated by the Kisaeng. The Kisaeng learned the formalized dance through the Gwonbeon, a pre-Korean War performance institution comparable to the Geisha tradition of Japan. One major change was the Kisaeng performers discontinued wearing the traditional mask while dancing Geommu. Geommu has remained a Court dance in the form of Jinju Geommu but has also retained its status as a primarily female dance.

== Costume and sword ==
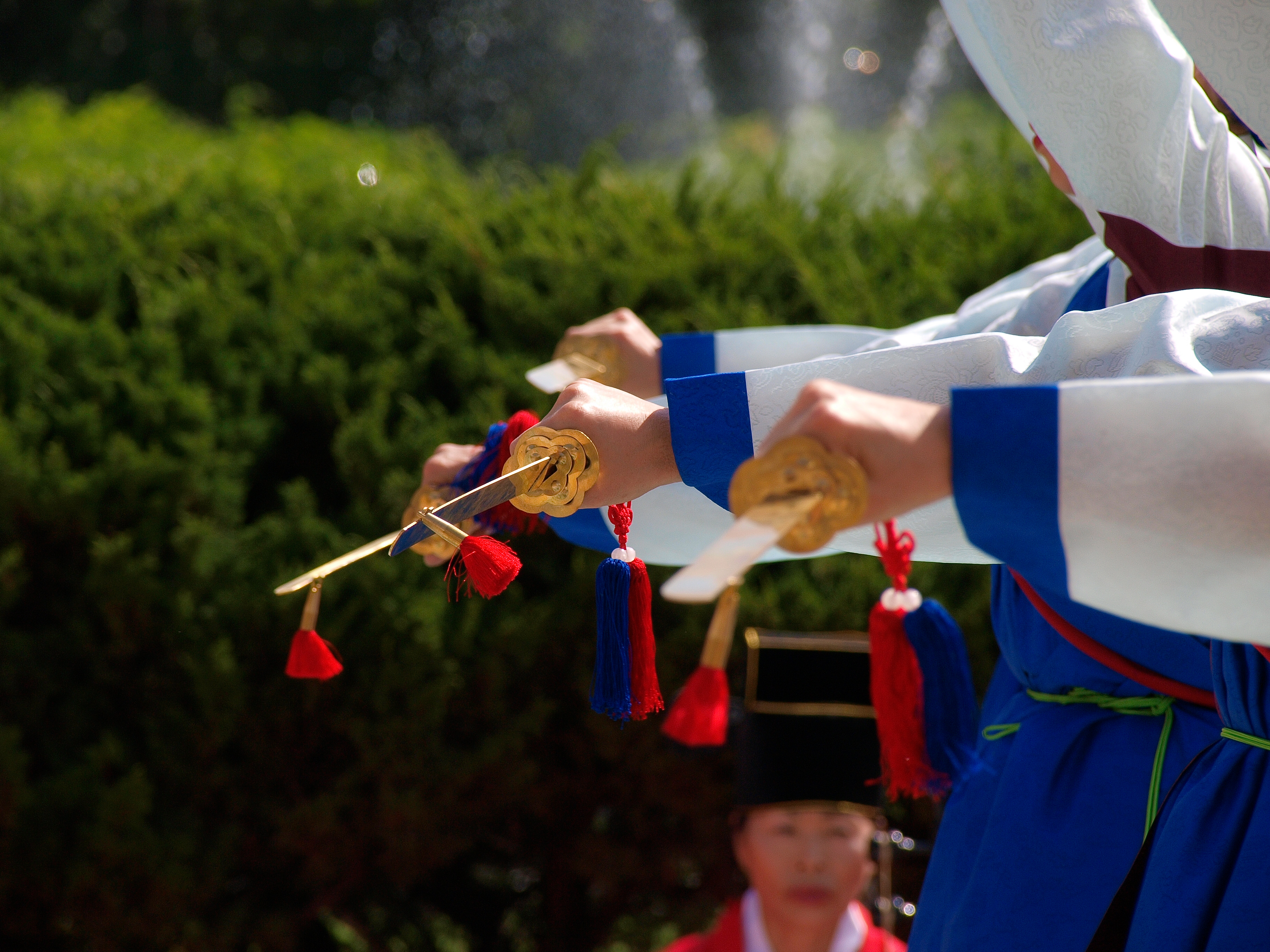
Swords

Dancers of Geommu wear Hanbok, Kwaeja (overcoat), Jeon-Dae (belt), and Jeon-Rip (military style cap). Hanbok is the traditional Korean dress that consists of Chima (a skirt) and Jeogori (a jacket). These elements combine to form a stylized version of the Joseon Dynasty military uniform. The costume traditionally has the colors of blue, red, yellow, green and black but many regional variations exist. The Jinju region has a blue Chima and a jade green Jeogori. Gwangju in the Jeolla Province has a red Chima and a light green Jeogori.

The knife or kal (칼) is the replica sword used in geommu, also referred to as a short sword, dangeom or dando (단검; 단도). Between the blade and the handle of a kal are three rings. These three rings have varying sizes and make sounds when performers dance the geommu.

== Performing geommu ==
Geommu is a group dancing activity performed by 6 to 8 performers. It has two unique characters which are chumsawi, a dance motion, and changdan, rhythmic cycle or 'long and short'. There are three typical motions, Ipchum-sawi, Anjeon-sawi, and Yeonpungdae. In Ipchum-sawi the dancers form two rows and stand face to face. Anjeon-sawi is to dance kneeling down while maintaining the two rows of Ipchum-sawi. The last motion, Yeonpungdae, the dancers form a circle and rotate in pattern.

== Variations ==
Geommu is a compound of the Korean words "geom", meaning sword, and "mu", meaning dance. This name applies to the base martial form of the dance. The dance is also known by the term hwangchangmu in reference to its origin story. The royal court version of the dance is called Jinju geommu.

== Geommu and Changdan rhythmic patterns ==
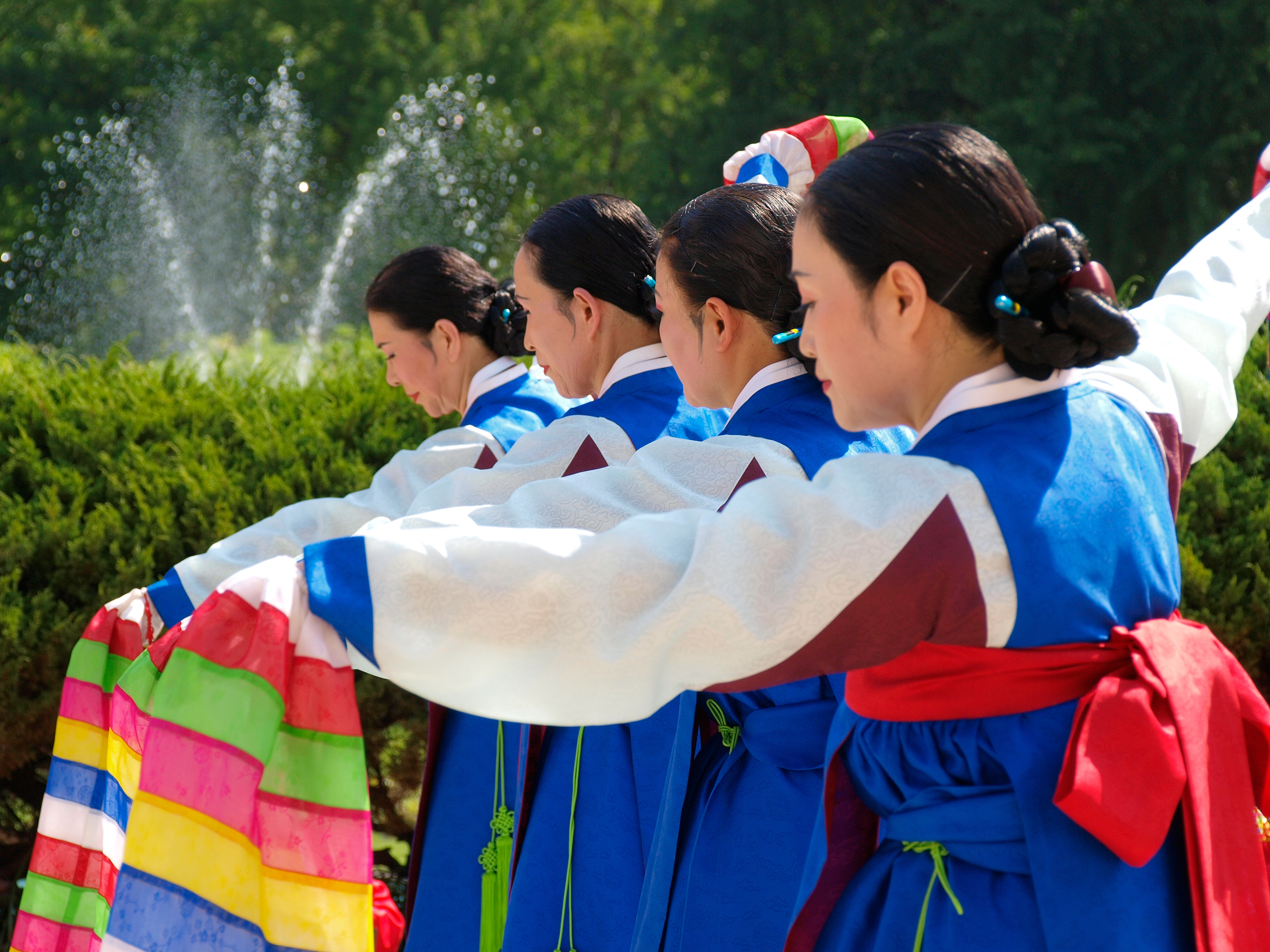

In Geommu, special rhythmic cycles called Changdan appear. Changdan is usually made by Janggu, a double-headed hourglass drum and Buk, a barrel drum. In Korea there are many variations of Changdan with each name designating a certain type of meter, tempo, and beat. Basic nature of Korean rhythmic patterns may be described as having these four main characteristics (Garland encyclopedia of world: East Asia- China, Japan, Korea, p. 901).

- A length of time, short enough to be held easily in memory and quickly recognized.
- A sense of speed (not tempo, which is related to beat)
- A typical meter, which fills the length of time
- Characteristic events the rhythmic pattern

== Types of traditional Korean music in geommu ==
The traditional Korean music of geommu is Samhyeon-Nyukgak. Originally, Samhyeon designated three chordophones, Geomungo, Gayageum, and Hyangbipa and Nyukgak designated Buk, Janggu, Haegeum, and Piri at the Unified Silla period from 654 to 780. The significance of Samhyeon had disappeared and remained the import of Nyukgak. Nowadays Samhyeonnyukgak indicates the wind instrumental music. It is used to accompany marching and dancing with 6 instruments, Haegeum, Janggu, Buk, Daegeum, and two Piri. Haegeum is a string instrument, resembling a violin. [Jangu] and [buk] are drums. Janggu is made from a hollow wooden body and two leather skins. The two sides produce sounds of different pitch and tone. Puk is a barrel-shaped with a round wooden body covered on both ends with animal skin. It is played with both an open hand and a wooden stick in the other hand. Daegeum and Piri are aerophones. Daegeum is a large bamboo transverse flute and Piri is a double reed instrument made of bamboo. Its large reed and cylindrical bore gives it a sound mellower than that of many other types of oboe.

== Preservation ==
Many parts of Geommu have been lost over time. South Korea established a law in 1962 named the Cultural Properties Protection Act in order to protect Geommu and other intangible cultural properties. Geommu was named as the 12th intangible cultural property by law in 1967. Geommu is actively preserved and practiced primarily in the Jinju, South Korea.

== See also ==
- Korean dance
- Seungjeonmu
- Mugo
- Korean culture
- Korean sword
- Traditional Korean music
- Yi Sun-sin
- Important Intangible Cultural Property
- Hwarang
- Gumdo
