= Seungjeonmu =

Traditional Korean court dance

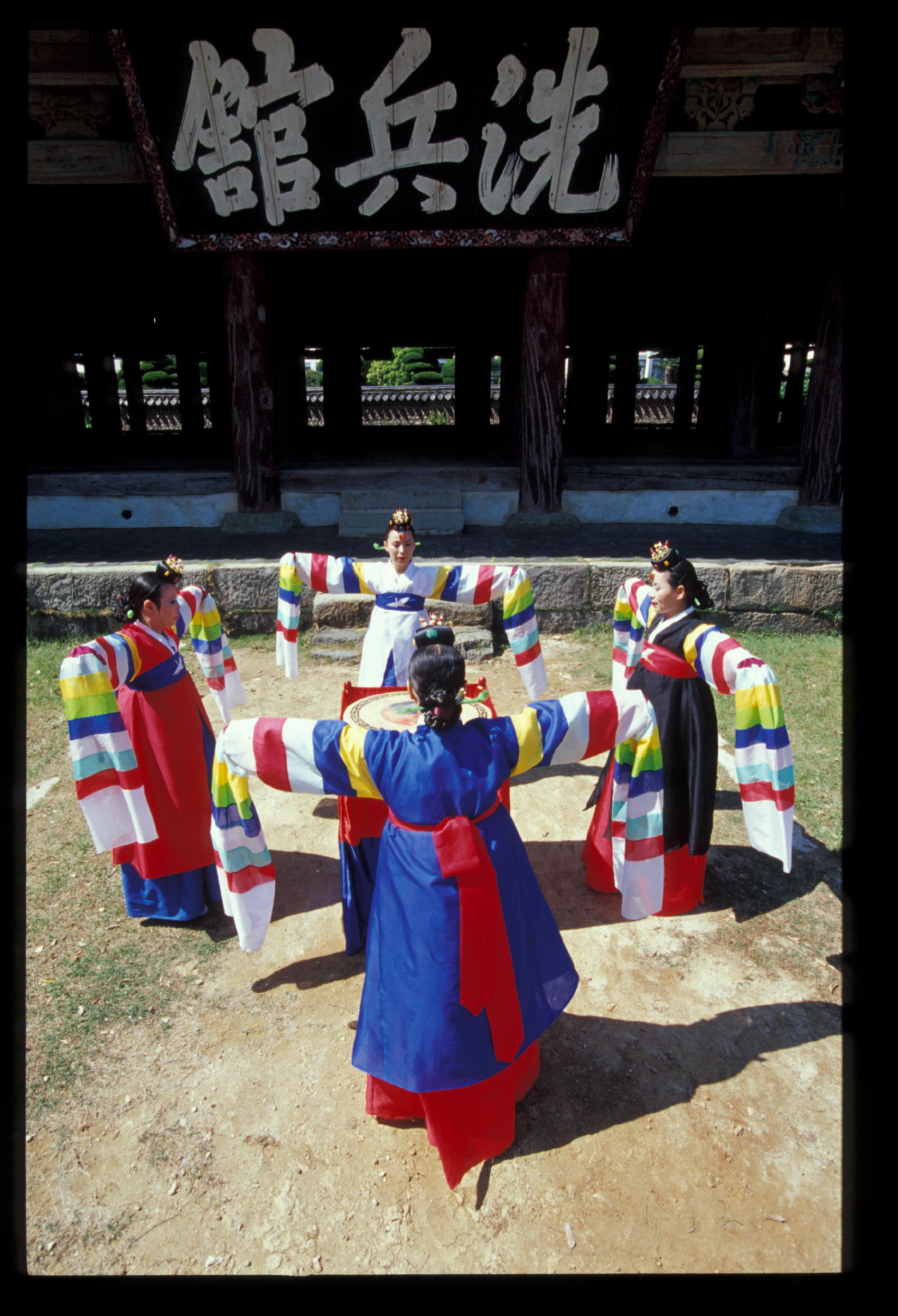
- Part of a performance (2004)

Korean name
- Hangul: 승전무
- Hanja: 勝戰舞
- Revised Romanization: Seungjeonmu
- McCune–Reischauer: Sŭngchŏnmu

Seungjeonmu (Korean: 승전무) is a Korean court dance to wish for and celebrate victory. It is originated 2000 years ago and is composed of a sword dance and drum dance called mugo. Seungjeonmu or Dance of Military Triumph was performed to wish for victory from gods of earth and heaven when the nation was at war. Seungjeonmu is South Korea's Important Intangible Cultural Properties number 21, designated on December 21, 1968. The dance is performed in honor of Admiral Yi Sun shin who gained victory during the Imjin war (1592–1598) of the mid-Joseon dynasty.

== Origins ==
Seungjeonmu originated between the 1st century BC and 7th century AD. Paintings of seungjeonmu are found in Goguryeo Wall Paintings that were drawn by Korean ancestors of ancient Goguryeo, a kingdom who conquered Northeast Asia. One wall painting called Gamudo draws dancers dancing in a circle while wearing dresses with long sleeves. This is an important ancient record that shows one of the earliest known Korean dances.

Seungjeonmu was handed down from Tongyeong, Gyeongsangnamdo. It was performed by women entertainers and dancing boys. Admiral Yi Sun shin had his soldiers dance the drum dance in order to reward them for their labors and raise morale. Originally, all dances performed in military units such as Mugo and sword dance were called dance of victory. But, among them, only Mugo was designated as an important intangible cultural asset in the name of dance of victory.

== Forms ==
Seungjeonmu is divided into 2 dancing parts. Drum dance and sword dance. The drum dance aroused the fighting spirit of the soldiers as it emulated the sound of their heartbeats. A taeguk pattern, which symbolizes the universe, was drawn on the drum. This symbol contained the wishes of the Korean people who wanted to be prosperous like the wide universe.

=== Drum dance ===
Drum dance of Seungjeonmu called Mugo is almost similar to Mugo of the Royal Court in terms of cloths, instruments, and dance steps, because it has the same origin. Begun in the time of King Chungnyeol (1274–1308) of Goryeo dynasty, it spread beyond the court during the Joseon period and was performed at local government ceremonies throughout the country. The type developed at Tongyeong is danced by four colorfully dressed dancers, wearing flower hats. It is performed around large drum which they beat to the accompaniment of an orchestra and their own songs. Sometimes it involves 12 other performers who dance around the four wind directions.

=== Sword dance ===
In the sword dance or geommu (검무), the sword is used to absorb energy from the heavens and purify the Seungjeonmu ritual. The main purpose of the sword dance is to pray to the gods for victory in an upcoming battle. Two real swords were used in the sword dance and in the climax of the dance, the dancer would expertly twirl the swords in rapid movements.

Four women dancers wearing archery cloths and holding Hansam in both hands begin seungjeonmu by beating drums in all directions. It is characterized by 3-advances and 3-retreats and magnificence nimble movements. It uses Samhyeun Dodeuri and Taryeong among Yeongsan Hoisang as accompaniment and has characteristics of unsophisticated and antique steps and movements.

== Admiral Yi Sun shin's honor ==
Seungjeonmu became a well-known dance when Admiral Yi Sun shin ordered his soldiers to dance the sword dance before engaging with the enemy in the Hansandaecheob naval battle, one of the greatest battles in world history. The dance was meant to uplift the fighting spirit of the soldiers, and the admiral went on to win the battle with his spirited troops.

The dances were performed at various ceremonies for some 300 years after the Naval Headquarters of the Three Provinces was instituted. They were also performed at the memorial services held in Admiral Yi's honor in the spring and the autumn, on his birthday and on the anniversary of his death.

== See also ==
- Korean Dance
- Yi Sun-sin
- Korean culture
- Korean sword
- Important Intangible Cultural Properties of Korea
