= Barachum =

Korean traditional ritual dance

- Hangul: 바라춤
- RR: barachum
- MR: parach'um

Barachum (Korean: 바라춤) is a representative of the Korean Buddhist ritual dance, (jakbeop), and is performed by Buddhist monks with a bara (Korean: 바라), a cymbal-like Korean instrument made with brass. The dance is composed of splendid and complicated movements among the jakbeop. Performers playing bara repeatedly step back and forth or revolve in agile action. The purpose of barachum is to expel evil spirits and to purify the mind.

== Types ==
Barachum consists of the six different types below:

- Cheonsu barachum (천수바라춤 千手---)
- Myeong barachum (명바라춤)
- Sadarani barachum (사다라니바라춤)
- Gwanyokge barachum (관욕게바라춤)
- Meok barachum (먹바라춤)
- Naerim barachum (내림바라춤)

== See also ==
- Nabichum (나비춤)
- Beopgochum (법고춤)
- Korean Buddhism
- Korean dance
