= Mugo =

Korean traditional court dance

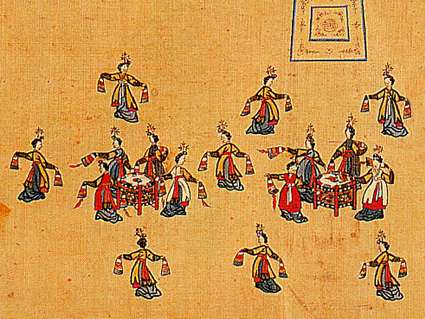
- Mugo performance depicted in Gojong Imin Jinyeon Dobyeong

Korean name
- Hangul: 무고
- Hanja: 舞鼓
- RR: mugo
- MR: mugo

Mugo (Korean: 무고) is a jeongjae (정재; 呈才): a Korean court dance performed using drums. It was created in the Goryeo period. It also practiced in ritual dance of Seungjeonmu. Its name comprises the two words, mu (무, 舞) and go (고, 鼓) literally meaning dance and drum in Korean respectively.

== Origins ==
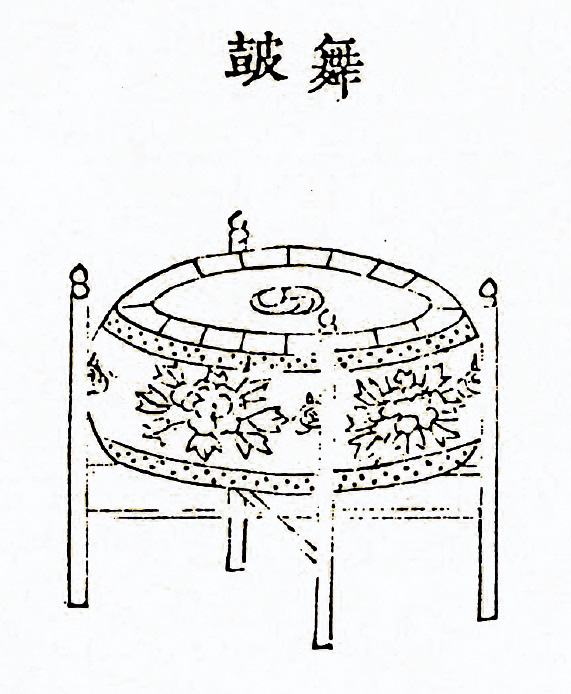
Buk for mugo described in Akhak Gwebeom

According to "Akji" (악지, 樂志), two books from "Goryeosa" (고려사 高麗史) which describe the music of Goryeo dynasty, mugo originated from a government officer, Lee Hon (hangul:이혼, Hanja:李混) during the reign of King Chungnyeol (reign. 1274 – 1308). While being exiled to Yonghae (영해, 寧海), a coastal region in North Gyeongsang Province, Lee Hon one day made a large drum of a log raft and played it while dancing. Later this dance was transmitted to the Joseon dynasty and was performed at various events of the Korean palaces and local government offices.

There has always been changes in the performance of "Mugo" per each time period since the Goryeo dynasty. The performance was played by Gisaeng who was hitting the drum and singing the song of Jeongeupsa (정읍사 井邑詞). As the number of drums changes, the number of Gisaeng also changes. Depending on the number of drums, the name also changed to two-drum dance, four-drum dance and eight-drum dance.

== Forms ==
Eight dancers perform with one large drum placed on the center of the stage. The main dancers called wonmu (원무), and the assisting dancers called hyeopmu (협무). Four dancers hold a drumstick in each hand, surround and play the drum; the others, holding a flower-shaped stick in each hand, form an outer circle. The dancers wear a jacket of which the color represents a certain direction: black-north, red-south, blue-east, and white-west.

== Music ==
Mugo is accompanied with court music Dongdongok (동돈곡) and Muaegok (무애곡) during the Goryeo period.

== See also ==
- Seungjeonmu
- Korean dance
- Traditional music of Korea
- Traditional Korean musical instruments
- Gisaeng
