= Taepyeongso =

Korean instrument

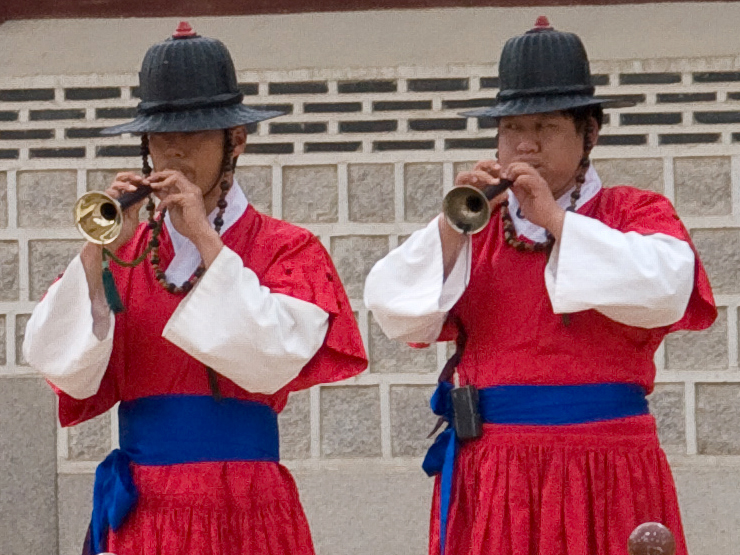
- Taepyeongso players playing in front of the Gyeongbokgung

Korean name
- Hangul: 태평소
- Hanja: 太平簫
- RR: taepyeongso
- MR: t'aep'yŏngso

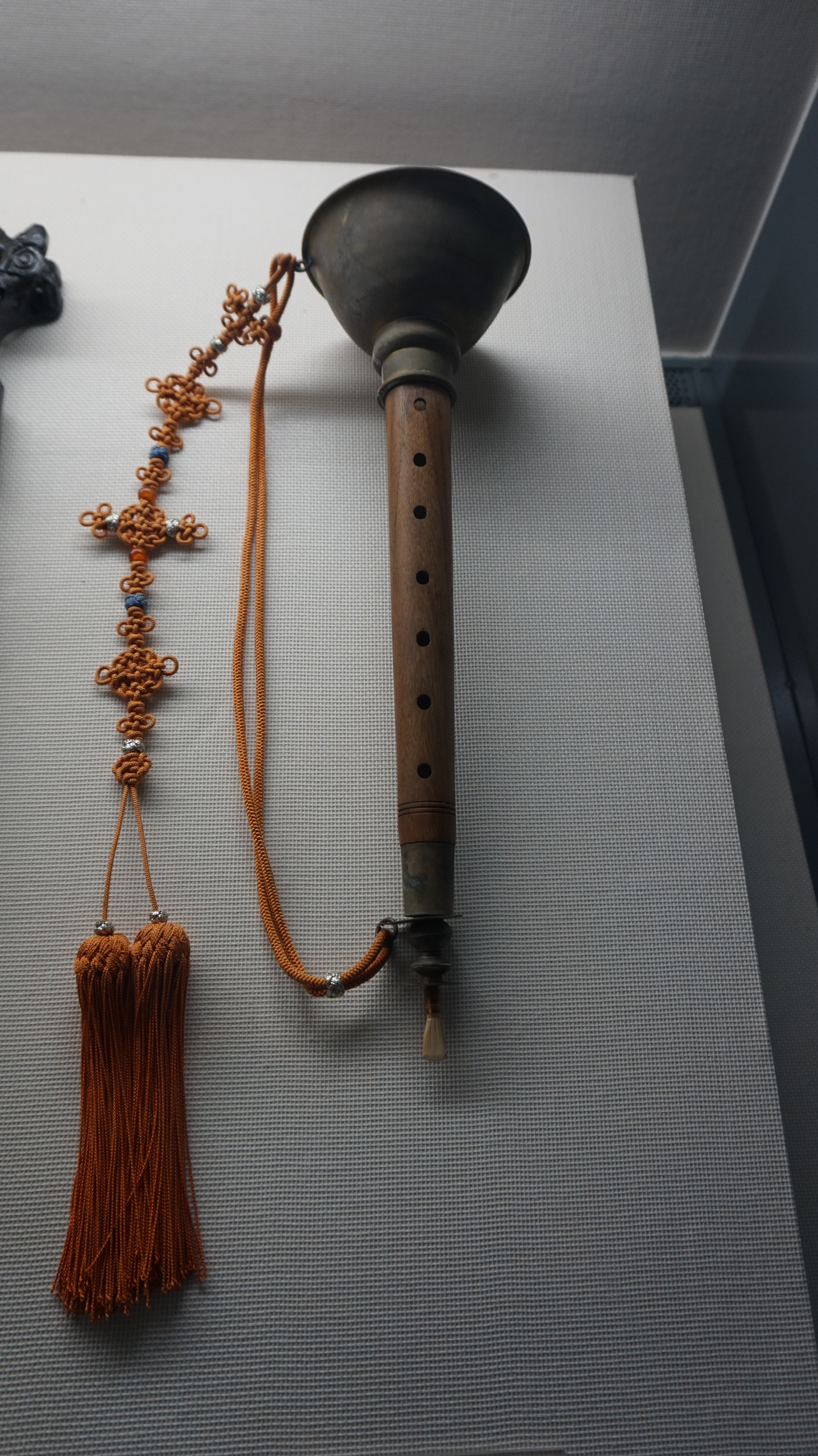
Taepyeongso

The taepyeongso (Korean: 태평소; lit. 'big peace wind instrument'), also called hojok, hojeok 호적 號笛/胡笛, nallari, or saenap (嗩吶 / 새납) , is a Korean double reed wind instrument in the shawm or oboe family. It is possibly descended from the Persian sorna and is closely related to the Chinese suona. It has a conical wooden body made from yuja (citron), daechu (jujube), or yellow mulberry wood, with a metal mouthpiece and cup-shaped metal bell. It originated during the Goryeo period (918–1392).

The loud and piercing sound it produces has kept it confined mostly to Korean folk music (especially "farmer's band music") and to marching bands, the latter performed for royalty in the genre known as daechwita. It is, however, also used sparingly in other genres, including Confucian, Buddhist and Shamanist ritual musics, neo-traditional/fusion music and K-pop, included in works such as "Lalalay" by Sunmi (2019).

The volume is large and the pitch is high, making it suitable for playing outdoors.

Taepyeongso was originally an instrument used in military camps, but after the late Joseon Dynasty (1392–1897), its playing area expanded to include nongak and Buddhist music. In recent years, it is also used as a solo instrument and in original music. Taepyeongso is the only instrument that plays a melody among the instruments used in military music, agricultural music, and Buddhist music.

== Writings ==
=== English ===
Written sources in English are scarce. The instrument is mentioned and discussed briefly in a number of books, such as those produced by the National Center for the Traditional Korean Performing Arts, which introduce Western readers to Korean music and culture. Nathan Hesselink's Pungmul (2006) devotes a few paragraphs of background to the instrument, as does Keith Howard's Korean Musical Instruments: A Practical Guide (1988). Lee Byong-Won's Buddhist Music of Korea (1987) provides brief analyses of taepyeongso playing in Buddhist ceremonial music and dance, as well as some important details about the players.

Maria Seo, in Hanyang Gut (2002), and Lee Yong-Shik in Shaman Ritual Music in Korea (2004), provide some context for taepyeongso playing in shaman rituals. Keith Howard has an interesting, although speculative, discussion on daechwita—royal processional music usually featuring two taepyeongso in Bands, Songs and Shamanistic Rituals (1989), and further context for taepyeongso in court music is provided by Song Kyong-Rin in "Korean Musical Instruments" (in Survey of Korean Arts: Traditional Music, 1973).

=== Korean ===
Journal articles include Go Boyun's overview of taepyeongso playing in pungmul, "풍물놀이를 위한 태평소 지도반" (2002), and an acoustical analysis of taepyeongso sound production by Byeon Jungbae, et al., entitled (in English) "Extraction of Characteristics Corresponding to Bell of Taepyeongso Based on Acoustical Analysis" (2007). Master's theses are more numerous. The list includes: A study of Buddhist ritual and taepyeongso (불교 의식과 태평소에 관한 연구) by Jeong Namgeun in 2001; "영산재에 연주되는 태평소 가락 분석" [analysis of taepyeongso melodies for yeongsanje] by Kim Wonseon (1999); "태평소 시나위 선율분석 연구:박종선류를 중심으로" [analysis of Bak Jongseon's sinawi] by Bak Gyeonghyeon (2004); "태평소와 사물놀이를 위한 관현악: '푸리'" ["puri" for taepyeongso and samulnori] by Hwang Uijong (1991); "한국 전통음악의 연구: 박범훈류 피리산조, 대풍류, 태평소시나위를 중심으로" [study of Korean 15 traditional music: connections between Bak Beomhun's taepyeongso sinawi, piri sanjo, and daepungnyu] by Yu Gyeongsu (1998); "대취타 변천과정에 대한 연구:태평소 선율을 중심으로" [study of the evolution of taepyeongso melody in daechwita] by Kang Yeonggeun (1998); "능게굿거리 선율 비교 분석 :지영희, 최경만 선율을 중심으로" [comparison of Choi Gyeongman's and Ji Yeonghi's neunggye gutgeori] by Kim Seongyeop (2005); and "동 서양의 겹 리드악기의 발전과 역사적 고찰" [development and history of double reed instruments in Korea and the west] by Kim Gi-nam (2004).

== History and classification ==
=== Names ===
The instrument is known by a number of names, including taepyeongso (hanja: "great peace pipe"), hojeok (hanja: "reed instrument of the Xianjiang people"), saenap/swenap (probably a transliteration of suona, the Chinese version of the instrument), and nallari/nalnari (pure Korean; onomatopoeic). The term saenap was adopted as the official term for educational use by the National Centre for the Traditional Korean Arts, but is currently the least commonly encountered, and NCKTPA's website now uses the term taepyeongso. The term nallari/nalnari tends to be associated with popular entertainment (especially pungmul), rather than ritual use.

=== Classification ===
Under the Hornbostel-Sachs system of classification, taepyeongso would be designated 422.112: an oboe with a conical bore. Indigenous classification systems in Korea categorize instruments by use/origin and by material. Classification by materials—called pal eum, or "eight tones"—is based on Chinese classification theory, and was used as the basis of the oft-cited 1908 document Jeungbo munheonbigo. In this document, taepyeongso is classified as bamboo, perhaps to reflect its similarity to piri, another double reed instrument. In later classifications based on pal eum, however, such as Kim Gi-su's Gugak Ipmun (1983), taepyeongso is sometimes reclassified as wood. The remaining six materials in this system are metal, silk, skin, stone, gourd, and clay. 'Classification by use' derives from the Goryeosa ("History of Goryeo", 1451) in which instruments were categorized according to whether they were used in aak (ritual music of Chinese origin), dangak (secular music of Chinese origin), and/or sogak (indigenous music), with some instruments being included in more than one category. Meanwhile, in the Akhak gwebeom, the encyclopedic 1493 treatise on music, instruments are similarly classified under the categories aak, dangak, and hyangak (indigenous music), but here instruments are placed in only one category, suggesting an 'origin'-based scheme rather than a 'use'-based scheme.

In this treatise, noteworthy for containing the earliest written mention of taepyeongso in Korea, taepyeongso appears—together with janggu, haegeum (spiked fiddle), ajaeng (bowed zither) and other instruments widely used in Korean folk traditions today—under dangak.

=== Introduction to Korea ===
The precise date of the instrument's introduction to Korea is unknown. It seems to not have been included in the historically significant gift of instruments given to the Goryeo-era King Yejeong by Emperor Huizong of Song in 1114, although similar instruments are mentioned, including "twenty oboes...with thin wooden tablets bound with gold and silver threads, red silk mattresses, and purple silk hyoppokcha". As indicated, the earliest mention of taepyeongso is in the 1493 Akhak gwebeom. The alternative name hojeok—referring to the peoples of the Xinjiang region of Northwest China from where the instrument is believed to have been introduced to East Asia during the third to fifth centuries—suggests a possible route for the instrument's introduction to Korea.

=== Distribution ===
The common Chinese term for this instrument type (suona) seems, like the shehnai of India and the Cambodian sralai, to be a transliteration of zurna, the Persian shawm. As suggested above, the Sino-Korean term "saenap" is likely another variation of this term. In any case, similar instruments have traveled widely from their purported roots in Persia—to Cuba, where it is known as the trompeta china and is used in carnival festivities (see Trompeta china); to Spain, where it is known as the dulzaina; to Kenya, where it is the bung'o or nzumari; to Croatia, where it is the sopila, and so on.

The instrument's loud, wailing cry lends itself to outdoor, public occasions, and it tends to be accompanied—in Korea and elsewhere—by drums and other percussion instruments. In North Korea, a new jang-saenap (장새납) with oboe-like keys, a mellower sound, and an extended range has been developed. There is at least one CD available in South Korea of this instrument—Choi Yeong-deok's Jang-saenap Dokju-kogjip—whose tracks include renditions of "Amazing Grace" and "Polovetsian Dances" by Alexander Borodin.

== Construction ==
=== Body of instrument ===
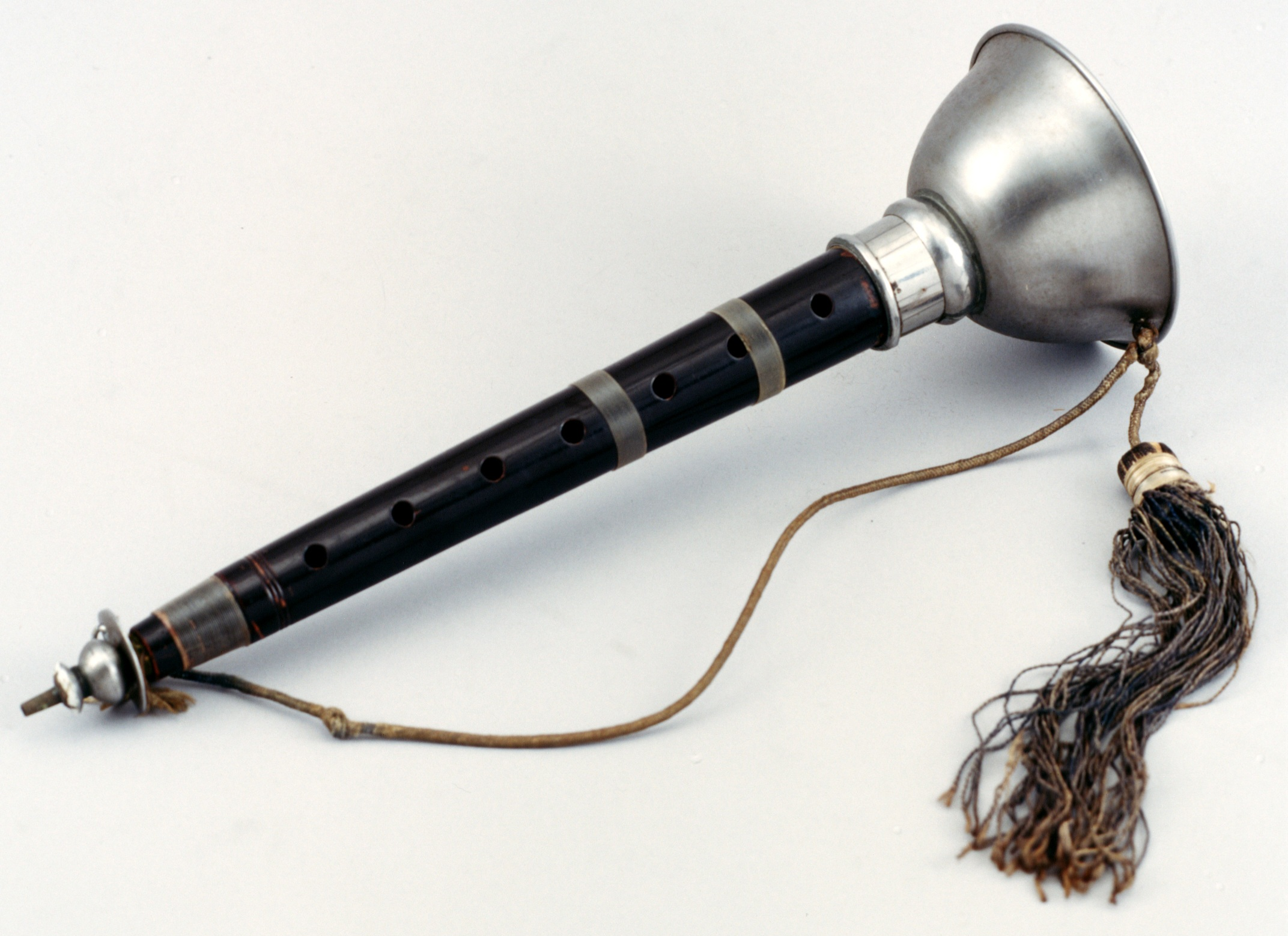
Taepyeongso

There are seven fingerholes on the front, of which only the upper five are normally used, and one in the back, which the left thumb nearly always covers (the main exception to this is daechwita, where all eight holes are played). Various types of wood are used, including jujube (Howard 1995, 55), citron wood, yellow mulberry wood (Yun 1998, 33), and ebony. Construction today is standardized, and most are imported from China, although one might imagine that in the past there must have been considerable variations in the construction. More expensive instruments can usually be taken completely apart for cleaning or replacement, while with cheaper instruments, normally only the bell and tassel can be removed.

=== Reeds ===
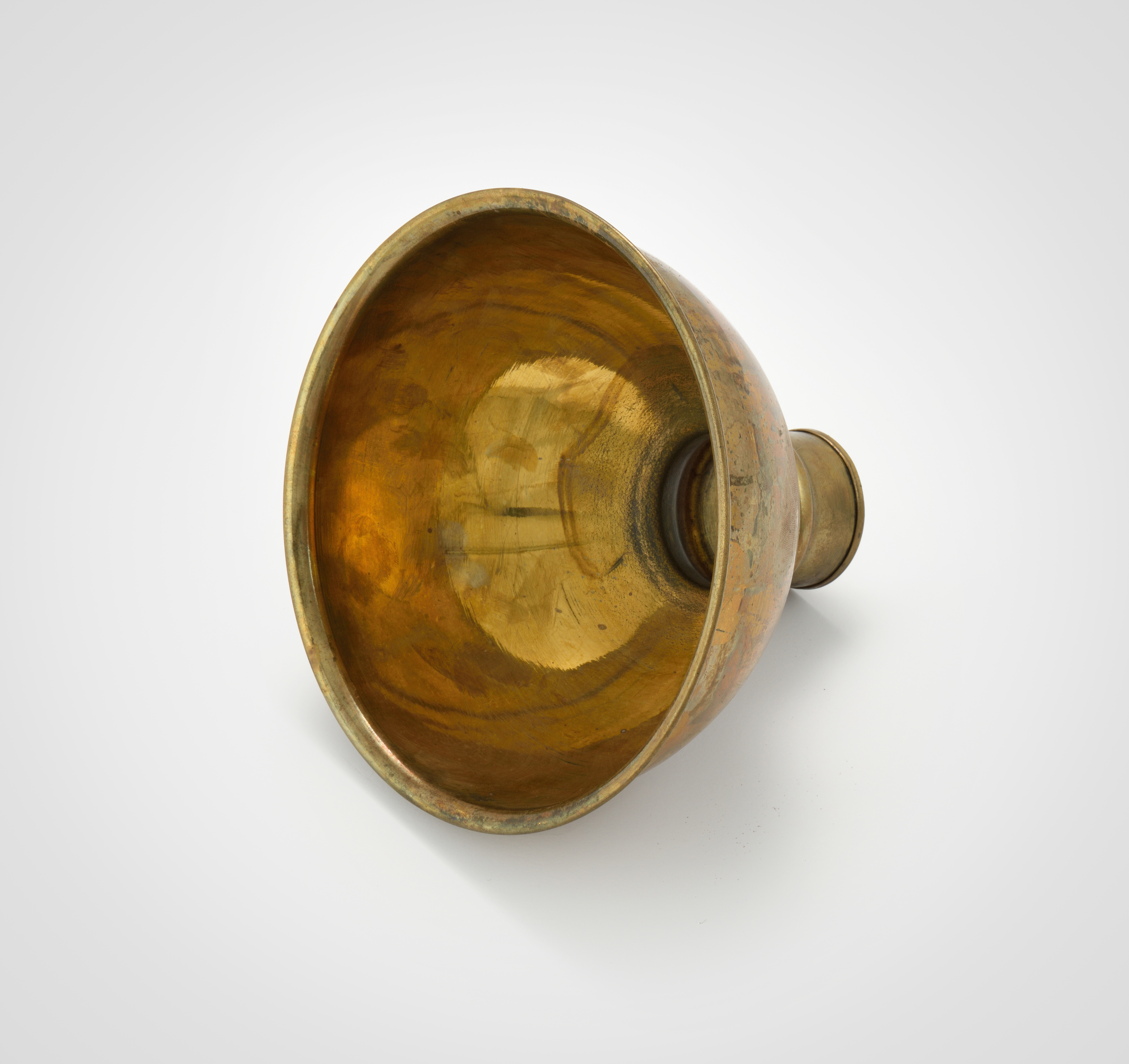
Dongpallang is attached to the end of the taepyeongso's body and serves to amplify the sound.

In the past, reeds were made of the stem of river reeds (galdae) hollowed out, repeatedly steamed and dried, sanded down and shaped, and bound at the bottom with thread to hold it firmly to the mouthpiece. Today, most players use pieces of plastic drinking straws.

==== Making a reed ====
1. Cut a piece of drinking straw to fit. The length depends on individual tastes—longer reeds make a lower sound and shorter reeds a higher sound.
2. Cut the corners off the top.
3. Flatten the reed in order to make two sharp edges.
4. Wrap a piece of fine grain sandpaper around the index finger or the instrument

(to make a curved surface).

1. Gently sand the flat part of the straw. Count how many strokes you execute on each side to maintain consistency. Test and sand as needed. Generally, a softer, thinner reed will be easier to produce sounds initially, but a certain degree of firmness is required to hit higher notes and manipulate the sound fully.

== Contexts ==
The contexts in which the taepyeongso is used are limited by its high volume. Thus, it is rarely used with voice or other melodic instruments, but frequently with drums, and almost always played outdoors.

=== Royal processions ===
The Sino-Korean term chwita literally means "blowing and hitting," while the prefix dae- means "great". Daechwita was used in processions—for example—for the "opening and closing of the gate to military headquarters" with a louder band (featuring taepyeongso) preceding the king and a softer one (featuring piri) following.

=== Confucianism ===
In Korean Confucian ritual music, the taepyeongso is used only in three songs—"Somu", "Punung", and "Yeonggwan" (Seo 2002, 206) of the Jeongdae-eop [praise of the military accomplishments of Korean leaders] section performed by the courtyard ensemble during Jongmyo jerye-ak (ritual music for Korean ancestors)

=== Buddhism ===
The taepyeongso is used to accompany ritual dance as part of the outdoor band called jorachi or gyeongnaechwi, together with a large gong, cymbals, a barrel drum, and an optional long trumpet and a conch shell.

=== Shamanism ===
According to most sources, the taepyeongso is not a central instrument in shaman ritual music. Maria Seo reports that the taepyeongso is not a traditional part of Hanyang Gut (ritual) of Seoul and is used only in specific situations: "The instrument is often played when several gut are in progress simultaneously. The piri player often switches to taepyeongso, producing a louder sound so that his own group of ritual specialists can follow the music better". Seo also mentions "ssang hojeok" (two taepyeongso played simultaneously), and the use of seven taepyeongso played simultaneously during a portion of the ritual in which her informant walked on knife blades. Lee Yong-Shik makes similar observations with regards to Hwanghae region rituals:

The use of these instruments (piri and taepyeongso) is limited to large-scale public performances. Hwanghae shamans tend to avoid the use of these melodic instruments in ritual practice because they think that such use would revise the ritual to festive celebration.

Lee further points out that the taepyeongso is not included in the samhyeonyukgak chamber ensemble used to accompany both shaman rituals and court dances in Seoul and Gyeonggi province.

In the southwest (Jeolla province), the taepyeongso is again an optional instrument in the sinawi ensemble of the southwestern region of Jeolla's shaman ritual. In the east, the taepyeongso was reintroduced into, and used frequently by, Kim Seok-chul in Donghae-an Byeolsingut (east coast purification ritual), but has been discontinued since his passing. In brief, the taepyeongso is used more as an effect than a core instrument in shaman ritual music, a situation made possible by the fact that the professional musicians who accompany shaman rituals are multi-instrumentalists, able to easily switch from one instrument to another.30

=== Pungmul and associated contexts ===
The primary context in which the taepyeongso is featured is during pungmul and other Namsadang (professional travelling entertainment troupe) activities, such as tightrope-walking and acrobatics. There is considerable overlap in the repertoire used for pungmul-based taepyeongso playing with shamanist and Buddhist ritual taepyeongso playing—indeed, it is often the same musicians involved.

=== New music and fusion ===
The taepyeongso is used frequently on new music and fusion recordings. In these contexts, the taepyeongso may play Western melodies, newly composed melodies, and/or traditional melodies. The primary uses of the taepyeongso in such contexts may be categorized as follows:

1. as a replacement for Western instruments (usually trumpet) in Western music-based ensembles;
2. in combination with Western instruments in neo-traditional ensembles;
3. as orchestral instruments in national music orchestras, such as the KBS Orchestra;
4. as one element in a fusion of more than one type of Korean music;
5. as a venue for experimental music.

The instrument has been used in contemporary popular music; Seo Tai-ji & Boys combined it with heavy metal music in the 1993 song "Hayeoga." It also plays a central role in Ground Zero's "Consume Red". A 57 minute long drone and experimental rock epic released in 1997.

== Repertoire ==
There is considerable overlap within the taepyeongso repertoire among the contexts the described above, with the exception of Confucian Ritual Music. Due to lack of information, North Korean styles are not discussed.

Generally, the repertoire is described in reference to three regional styles: neunggye or gyeongtori (Central Region), Sinawi (Southwestern Region), and Menari (Eastern Region). While these styles were once presumably confined to their respective regions, players today are mostly familiar with each regional style and freely mix (or do not mix) the styles according to personal preference.

Describing these styles in terms of western musical theory is problematic insofar as tunings and formal characteristics differ among individual players. Unlike European art music, the taepyeongso repertoire has traditionally been transmitted directly from teacher to student without aid of written scores, resulting in widely varying interpretations of melodic forms.

=== Tones and fingerings ===
The modern taepyeongso has eight fingerholes, seven in front and one on the back. Of the seven frontal fingerholes, most styles are played using only the upper five holes, with the hole in the back remaining covered. The instrument is capable of producing two full octaves, but is mostly confined to approximately an octave and a half. The tones that result from blowing the instrument while covering any particular number of fingerholes vary according to the particular construction of the instrument, the reed, and the player's embouchure. Specific terms for notes produced by various combinations of covered/uncovered holes are provided by Korean musical theory, imported and adapted from Chinese musical theory. The western note designations provided below are approximate.

1. Upper five frontal fingerholes covered: Im (임,林), approximately B
2. Upper four frontal fingerholes covered: Nam (남,南), approximately C
3. Upper three frontal fingerholes covered: Mu (무,無), approximately D
4. Upper two frontal fingerholes covered: Hwang 황,黃), approximately E
5. Upper one frontal fingerhole covered: Tae (태,太), approximately F
6. No frontal fingerholes covered: Jung (중,仲) or Go (고), approximately G/A

Upper octave notes share the same names, although they assume different roles and functions from lower octave notes within melodic constructions. Identical or similar tones may be produced with a variety of different fingerings. Different fingerings may be used to produce different timbres; basic fingering patterns may also vary from teacher to teacher, depending on personal habits and preferences.

=== Neunggye/Gyeongtori ===
The term neunggye is of uncertain meaning and origin. It is used almost exclusively to refer to taepyeongso melodies of the central region and is associated particularly with pungmul contexts. The term gyeongtori is a modern construct consisting of a regional designation ('gyeong', referring to gyeonggi province) and a modern musicological term ('-tori', that is, regional mode). The former term, neunggye, is somewhat nebulous, and may refer to either specific melodies or a general style, while the latter refers only to the regional style, but is mostly confined to academic usage.

Compared with other regional styles, the gyeongtori style has a greater variety of individual melodies, but is more fixed in its formal characteristics. Below are listed the most common gyeongtori melodies for taepyeongso.

==== Neunggye Gutgeori ====
Neunggye Gutgeori is commonly employed as a beginning piece for new players.

It shares basic melodic and formal characteristics with, and most likely is derived from, the folksong Taepyeongga and the related gyeonggi shaman song Changbutaryeong.

It has a fixed form consisting of three main sections, although this form is sometimes varied.

As the name indicates, it is played to gutgeori jangdan. In general, neunggye melodies feature a descending contour.

==== Neunggye Jajinmori ====
Neunggye Jajinmori shares some of the important characteristics of Neungye Gutgeori, such as descending melodic lines, a characteristic cadential phrase echoing that of Neunggye Gutgeori, consistent vibrato on Im and Hwang, and an opening phrase emphasizing Jung. Unlike Neunggye Gutgeori, it does not have a fixed form—a melodic cycle may last for anywhere from one to eleven (or more, at least theoretically) rhythmic cycles.

It is played to jajinmori jangdan.

==== Giltaryeong/Cheonsubara ====
Giltaryeong, or 'road melody', is a short, sixteen beat melody with a fixed form.

It may be played with a variety of different jangdan.

When played with hwimori jangdan, it is commonly referred to as "Neunggye Hwimori", or simply "Hwimori".

Cheonsubara, a melody used by taepyeongso players to accompany Buddhist ceremonial dance, is essentially identical to Giltaryeong.

==== Heoteuntaryong ====
Heoteun, like 'san' in sanjo, means 'scattered' or 'dispersed'; thus, heoteuntaryeong means 'scattered melody'.

This melody is distinct from other taepyeongso melodies of the gyeonggi region in having Tae, rather than Im or Hwang, as its primary tone.

It has a non-fixed form which can be adapted to a wide range of jangdan, and is a popular vehicle for relatively free improvisation.

==== Gutgeori ====
This melody, known by its primary accompanying jangdan (even though it may also be adapted to jajinmori jangdan), is a fixed-form melody consisting, like Neunggye Gutgeori, of three main sections.

Here, however, each section is two, rather than four (as in Neunggye Gutgeori), rhythmic cycles in duration.

The melody is associated with shaman rituals, and is often performed together with a wind ensemble called samhyeonyukgak.

==== Yeombul/Heoncheonsu ====
Yeombul or Yeombultaryeong [song of sutra], is primarily associated with Buddhist ritual music.

It is sometimes performed by ssang hojeok (two taepyeongso played simultaneously in approximate unison).

==== Daechwita ====
Daechwita was used to accompany state processions during the Joseon dynasty.

It is frequently performed by ssang hojeok, has a fixed form and, unlike most taepyeongso melodies, is rarely played outside of the original context (that is, one is very unlikely to hear it used for pungmul accompaniment, for example).

==== Assorted Minyo-derived melodies ====
This category includes any number of folksong melodies which may be adapted for taepyeongso in an entertainment context.

The most widely played folksong on taepyeongso is undoubtedly Pungnyeonga, a 'farming' song which asks for a good harvest.

Other melodies in this category include Cheonnyeonmanse, Hangangsutaryeong, Taepyeongga, Yangsando, and Golpaetaryeong, among others.

=== Sinawi ===
Compared with Neunggye Gutgeori and other gyeong-tori melodies, sinawi features a much more free form of improvisation and, in terms of mood, tends to be associated with sorrow.

According to Lee Bohyeong, the term sinawi is derived from sanoe or sanae, the religious folk music of the Shilla Dynasty (2002, 889).

He further differentiates between several types of sinawi: "the original sinawi, which accompanied shaman chants and dances; the non-ritual sinawi, which was performed solo or in an ensemble; the transitional sinawi, which still maintained its improvisational style but was changing into sanjo with influence from the narrative vocal genre p'ansori; and finally the fixed sinawi, which had formal rhythmic and modal schemes and fixed melodic structure" (890).

Taepyeongso sinawi would seem to fall somewhere between the second and last of these types—a solo, non-ritual form which frequently follows a fixed rhythmic progression.

Melodies based on sinawi are also commonly used to accompany pungmul ensembles.

From Kim Seonghak, "Taepyeongso eumgye iyagi gyemyeonjo (sinawi)":

General comments Neunggye is communal: individuality is controlled. Sinawi, on the other hand, represents personal expression. For example, neunggye is like being a little drunk—one enjoys oneself but remains in control. Sinawi is like being completely wasted and being able to express one's emotion without any inhibition whatsoever.

Neunggye follows the jangdan closely, so it is more accessible to listeners. They think they understand it fully on the first listening and, even though their knowledge is superficial, they don't feel the need to study it more closely. Sinawi, on the other hand, plays with the jangdan, and embarrasses the jangdan.

Sometimes in sinawi, the player will produce a long sigh, and then suddenly yell out. The janggu player has to be careful to not get sucked in by the sinawi melody. Sinawi has a lot of charisma. It is not controlled by the jangdan, but at the same time is able to create a sort of harmony with the jangdan. It has the power to affect people deeply. Normally, sadness on its own is not enjoyable, but when expressed through sinawi, it can be experienced as a sort of happiness. Sinawi can make any emotion pleasurable.

The basic tones of sinawi are Im, Mu, Tae, upper Im, and upper Mu. Lower Jung and Hwang are like seasoning. While improvising, one can occasionally use upper Tae and upper Jung.

Tone	Description
Im	Both upper and lower Im are considered to be 'eu-tteum-eum' (tonic note). Usually upper Im functions as the main tonic and lower Im as the cadential tonic. Playing Im clearly in sinawi requires a softer and thinner reed than in neunggye. When approaching lower Im from above, one must calm oneself down emotionally.
Mu	Although Mu occupies the second step ascending from lower Im—like Nam in neunggye—the functions of Mu and Nam are completely different. Lower Mu is like a rest stop on the highway—one is glad to arrive, but doesn't want to stay too long. Lower Mu, when it mixes with Hwang and Tae, can produce a variety of emotional effects: excitement, sobbing, tenderness, and so on.
Tae	Tae in sinawi is similar to Tae in neunggye: it is exciting and bright, but should be used sparingly. It can be used to turn a sad feeling into a joyful feeling.
Jung	Jung in sinawi is a half-step higher than in neunggye. A common mistake for beginners is to not play Jung high enough. Jung in sinawi has a similar role to Nam in neunggye—as a bridge between two adjacent tones.
Upper Im	Upper Im appears frequently as it is the tonic note. It is also in the middle, of the instrument's range, so is central in that sense as well.
Upper Mu	Upper Mu is like yelling, or like making a confession—an outpouring of total openness and honesty. It is a release of pure emotion. It gives limited pleasure, but it is honest and direct. Upper Mu is completely unlike upper Hwang in neunggye.
Upper Tae	These pitches are extremely rare. Making these high sounds is like making a diamond—it needs time, patience, and a good reed. High Jung is the highest sound that the taepyeongso can make, and is beyond the ability of most people.
Upper Jung	These pitches are extremely rare. Making these high sounds is like making a diamond—it needs time, patience, and a good reed. High Jung is the highest sound that the taepyeongso can make, and is beyond the ability of most people.

-translated and summarized from "Taepyeongso eumgye iyagi gyemyeonjo (sinawi)", nd.

=== Menari ===
Menari-tori is the least played of taepyeongso styles. As with neunggye, there are particular folksong-derived menari-tori melodies—most notably Baetnorae—which can be played on taepyeongso but, like sinawi, menari is used more commonly as a melodic springboard for freer forms of improvisation. Menari's primary characteristic phrase consists of a downwards sequence of tae-hwang-nam. Unlike neunggye and sinawi, the primary tone of menari is tae, while im is only rarely sounded.

== Notable players ==
- Joseph Celli
- Bill Cole
- Alan Heyman (Korean: 해의만)
- Lee Saeng-gang (Korean: 이생강)
- Lee Yoon-Ji (Korean: 이윤지)
- Jang Sa-ik (Korean: 장사익)
- Kim Seok-chul (Korean: 김석출)

== See also ==
- Korean music
- Nongak
- Samulnori
- Traditional Korean musical instruments

== Notes and references ==
=== Notations ===
- NCKTPA Taepyeongso page
- Baines, Anthony. Shawms of the Sardana Coblas, The Galpin Society Journal 5 (March 1952): 9–16.
- Bak, Gyeong-hyeon. Taepyeongso sinawi seonyulbunseok yeon-gu: Bak Jongseonryoreul jungsimeuro [Analysis of Bak Jongseon's sinawi]. Master's thesis, Dongguk University, 2004.
- Bak Jong-seon. Taepyeongso sinawi, Park Jong-sen A-jaeng Sanjo. Seoul, Records SRCD 1190, 1994. Compact Disc.
- Ben, Wu. Archaeology of Musical Instruments in China. In Garland Encyclopedia of World Music Vol. 7, 2002. 105–114.
- Choi, Gyeong-man. Neunggyetaryeong, jajinneunggyetaryeong, Choi Kyungman's Piri Plays. Synnara SYNCD-093/094. Compact Disc.
- Choi In-seo. Taepyeongso neunggye. Korean Traditional Music. National Center for Korean Traditional Performing Arts, n.d. Compact Disc.
- Dick, Alastair. The Early History of the Shawm in India. The Galpin Society Journal 37 (Mar. 1984): 80–98
- Francis, Aaron. "Drinking Straws and Shaman Melodies: a Historical and Analytical Study of the Taepyeongso" (Master's Thesis)
- Go, Boyun. Pungmulnolireul wihan taepyeongso jidoban [a study of taepyeongso in pungmul]. Gugakgwa gyoyuk 20 (2002): 193–225.
- Gongmyoung. Deep Sea. Deep Sea. Z-KTL-7139, 2007. Compact Disc.
- Hahn, Man-young. Kugak: Studies in Korean Traditional Music. Seoul: Tamgudang, 1990. 106
- Heo Yong-eop. Master Musician of the shaman and folk music: Heo Yong-eop Solo Instrumental Album. Hwaeum TOPCD 099, 1996/2006. Compact Disc.
- Hesselink, Nathan, Pungmul: South Korean Drumming and Dance, Chicago: University of Chicago Press, 2006.
- Hornbostel, Erich M. von, and Curt Sachs. Classification of Musical Instruments: Translated from the Original German by Anthony Baines and Klaus P. Wachsmann. The Galpin Society Journal 14, (Mar. 1961): 3–29.
- Howard, Keith, Bands, Songs, and Shamanistic Rituals: Folk Music in Korean Society 2nd ed.. Seoul: Royal Asiatic Society (Korea Branch), 1990.
- Howard, Keith, Korean Musical Instruments, Oxford: Oxford University Press, 1995.
- Howard, Keith, Korean Musical Instruments: A Practical Guide, Seoul: Se-Kwang Music Publishing, 1988.
- Hwang, Jun-yeon. Modes and Scales of Korean Music. In Hanguk jeontong eumakui akjo [A study of modes in Korean traditional music]. Seoul: Seoul National University Press, 2005.
- Hyslop, Graham. Musical Instruments of East Africa: 1 Kenya. Nairobi: Nelson Africa, 1975.
- Kang, Yeonggeun. Daechwita byeonceon-gwajeong-e daehan yeongu: taepyeongso seonyul-eul jungsimero [A study of the evolution of taepyeongso melody in daechwita]. Master's thesis, Seoul National University, 1998.
- Kim Chanseop. Dokjugok-neunggye. Biseong. Nices SCO 054CSS, 1995. Compact Disc.
- Kim Duk Soo. Kwigok. Spirit of Nature. Nanjang Music TE004-01, 2001. Compact Disc. 107
- Kim Duk Soo Samulnori. Utdari pungmulgutgarak. Gyeoljeongpan. Syannara SYNCCD 115, 1996. Compact Disc.
- Kim, Gi-nam. Dung seoyang-ui gyeob rideu-akgi-ui baljeongwa yeoksajeok gochal [Development and history of double reed instruments in Korea and the west]. Master's thesis, Chungnam University, 2004).
- Kim Jeomseok. Instrumental Music of Kim Chom Sok. Seoul Records SRCD 1457, n.d. Compact Disc.
- Kim Seokchul. Chong. Donghae-an musok samul. Samsung Music SCO-041CSS, 1994. Compact Disc.
- Kim, Seongyeop. Neunggyegutgeori seonyul bigyo bunseok: Ji Yeonghui, Choi Gyeongman seonyul-eul jungsimeuro [Comparison of Choi Gyeongman's and Ji Yeonghi's neunggye gutgeori]. Master's thesis, Chugye University for the Arts, 2005.
- Kim Seunghak. Taepyeongso eumgye iyagi pyeongjo (neunggye) [Discussion of pyeongjo (neunggye) pitches for taepyeongso]. www.café.daum.net (taepyeongso) (accessed August 25, 2008).
- Kim Seunghak. Taepyeongso eumgye iyagi gyemyeonjo (sinawi) [Discussion of gyemyeonjo (sinawi) pitches for taepyeongso]. www.café.daum.net (taepyeongso) (accessed August 25, 2008).
- Kim, Wonseon. Yeongsanjae-e Yeonjudweneun taepyeongso garak bunseok [Analysis of taepyeongso melodies for yeongsanje]. Master's thesis, Dongguk University, 1999.
- Lee, Byong Won. Buddhist Music of Korea. Seoul: Jungeumsa, 1987.
- Lee, Hye-Ku. Essays on Traditional Korean Music. Seoul: Royal Asiatic Society (Korea Branch), 1981.
- Lee, Kang-Sook. An Essay on Korean Modes. Asian Music 9:2 (1978): 41–47.
- Lee Jongdae. Taepyeongso and Samulnori. Art World of Lee Jong-dae's Piri. Jigu TOPCD 060, 2003. Compact Disc.
- Lee Senggang. Dokmu—gutgeori (neunggye)/ jajin (neunggye)/ dongsalpuri (taak)/jajin. Nongak. Samsung Music, 1993. Compact Disc.
- Lee Wol-chool. Anthology of Korean Traditional Music Vol. 1. Seoul: Korean Traditional Music Publication Company, 1969.108
- Lee, Yong-Shik. Shaman Ritual Music of Korea. Seoul: Jimoondung International, 2004.
- Pratt, Keith. Korean Music: Its History and Its Performance. London, Faber Music, 1987.
- Provine, Robert. The Treatise on Ceremonial Music (1439) in the Annals of the Korean King Sejong. Ethnomusicology 18:1 (Jan. 1974): 1–29.
- Pyoun, Joongbae, Sangjin Cho, Yeonwoo Hong, and Uipil Chong. Extraction of Characteristics Corresponding to Bell of Taepyeongso Based on Acoustical Analysis. Hanguk eumhyanghakhoeji 27:1 (2008): 12–17.
- Seo, Maria. Hanyang Gut: Korean Shaman Ritual Music from Seoul. New York: Routledge, 2002.
- Seo Yongseok. Taepyeongso and Samulnori. Korean Traditional Music. National Center for Korean Traditional Performing Arts, n.d. Compact Disc.
- So, Inhwa. Theoretical Perspectives on Korean Traditional Music: An Introduction. Seoul: National Center for Korean Traditional Performing Arts, 2002.
- Song, Bang-song. Source Readings in Korean Music. Seoul: Korean National Commission for UNESCO, 1980.
- Song, Kyong-Rin. Korean Musical Instruments. In Survey of Korean Arts: Traditional Music, National Academy of Arts, 31–76. Seoul: National Academy of Arts, 1973.
- Yu, Gyeongsu. Hanguk jeontongeumakui yeongu: Bak Beomhun-ryu piri-sanjo, daepungnyu, taepyeongso-sinawi-reul jungsimeuro [A study of Korean traditional music: connections between Bak Beomhun's taepyeongso sinawi, piri sanjo, and daepungnyu]. Master's thesis, National Central University, 1998.109
- Yun, Myung-won. A Study of Musical Instruments in Korean Traditional Music. Seoul: National Center for Korean Traditional Performing Arts, 1998.

==== Korean notations ====
- Hwang, Uijong. Taepyeongso-wa samulnolireul wihan gwanhyeonak, 'puri' [Puri for taepyeongso and samulnori]. Master's thesis, Busan University, 1991.
- Jeong, Nam-geun. Bulgyo wisikgaw taepyeongso-e gwanhan yeongu [A study of Buddhist ritual and taepyeongso]. Master's thesis, Dongguk University, 2001.
