= Sujecheon =

- Hangul: 수제천
- Hanja: 壽濟天
- RR: Sujecheon
- MR: Sujech'ŏn

Sujecheon is a Korean court music composition in four movements dating to the mid-7th century Baekje era. It is the most representative piece in the jeongak repertoire. It is performed by an ensemble composed primarily of wind instruments, including the piri and daegeum. It originally had a vocal part, but today is performed instrumentally. The title Sujecheon may be translated as "Long Life, Immeasurable as the Heavens."

== Background ==
Sujecheon originated from a mid-7th century song called Jeongup or Jeongupsa (Jeongupsa refers to the music's lyrics). During the Goryeo dynasty, in the 10th century, the song was sung together with a dance performance. In the 14th century, it was sung as an accompaniment for the procession of the king or crown prince. It was passed down to the Joseon dynasty where it was written down in the Hangul script, the first song to be so-written. It then became a purely instrumental piece performed by 6 musicians, but it can also be performed by a larger ensemble.

The song is about a woman who waits on top of a mountain for her husband to return.

== See also ==
- Aak
- Dangak
- Hyangak
- Yeominrak
