= Tōgaku =

Tōgaku (唐楽, literally "Tang dynasty music") is the Japanese pronunciation of an early style of music and dance from the Tang dynasty in China. Tōgaku was introduced into Japanese culture from China no earlier than the 8th century, and is still performed as one style of the imperial court music called gagaku.

During the Nara period (710–794), music and dances continued to flow into the capital from many parts of Asia. Many styles were eventually organized under two basic categories of gagaku. The first, tōgaku, consisted of pieces of Chinese and Indian origin, while komagaku included Manchurian, Korean, and many of the Japanese pieces. These two styles can be distinguished by their instrumentations.

The Korea equivalent of tōgaku (also introduced from China) is called dangak.

The instruments used in tōgaku are the shō, gakuso, shōko, hichiriki, ryūteki, taiko and kakko.

== See also ==
- Gagaku
- Yayue
- Korean court music
- Aak
- Dangak
- Hyangak
