= 雅樂 =

The Chinese characters 雅樂 may refer to:

- Yayue, the ancient court ritual music of China
- Gagaku, the ancient court ritual music of Japan, of Chinese and Korean origin
- Aak, the ancient court ritual music of Korea, of Chinese origin
- Nhã nhạc, the ancient court ritual music of Vietnam, of Chinese origin
