= Yŏmillak =

Korean court song by Sejong the Great

Yŏmillak (Korean: 여민락; Hanja: 與民樂; RR: Yeomillak; lit. 'Enjoyment with the People') is a court song in Hyangak style, composed by Sejong the Great (1418–1450) during the Joseon dynasty period in Korea.

== Origins ==
Yŏmillak, which means Enjoyment with the People, was created based on Korean court music that the king shared to his people to be enjoyed together. This song was created during his 29th year of reign (1447) and actually had lyrics from the Yongbi eocheonga, but only the melodic component is existent today. It is usually played on Hangul Day in South Korea to celebrate the promulgation of Hangul by King Sejong, and also in religious services for the Ancestral Shrine of the royal family, honoring the Royal Court, and for the Civil and Military authorities.

== See also ==
- Aak
- Hyangak
- Jeongak
- Korean court music
- Korean culture
- Korean music
