= Yayue =

Form of classical Chinese music and dance

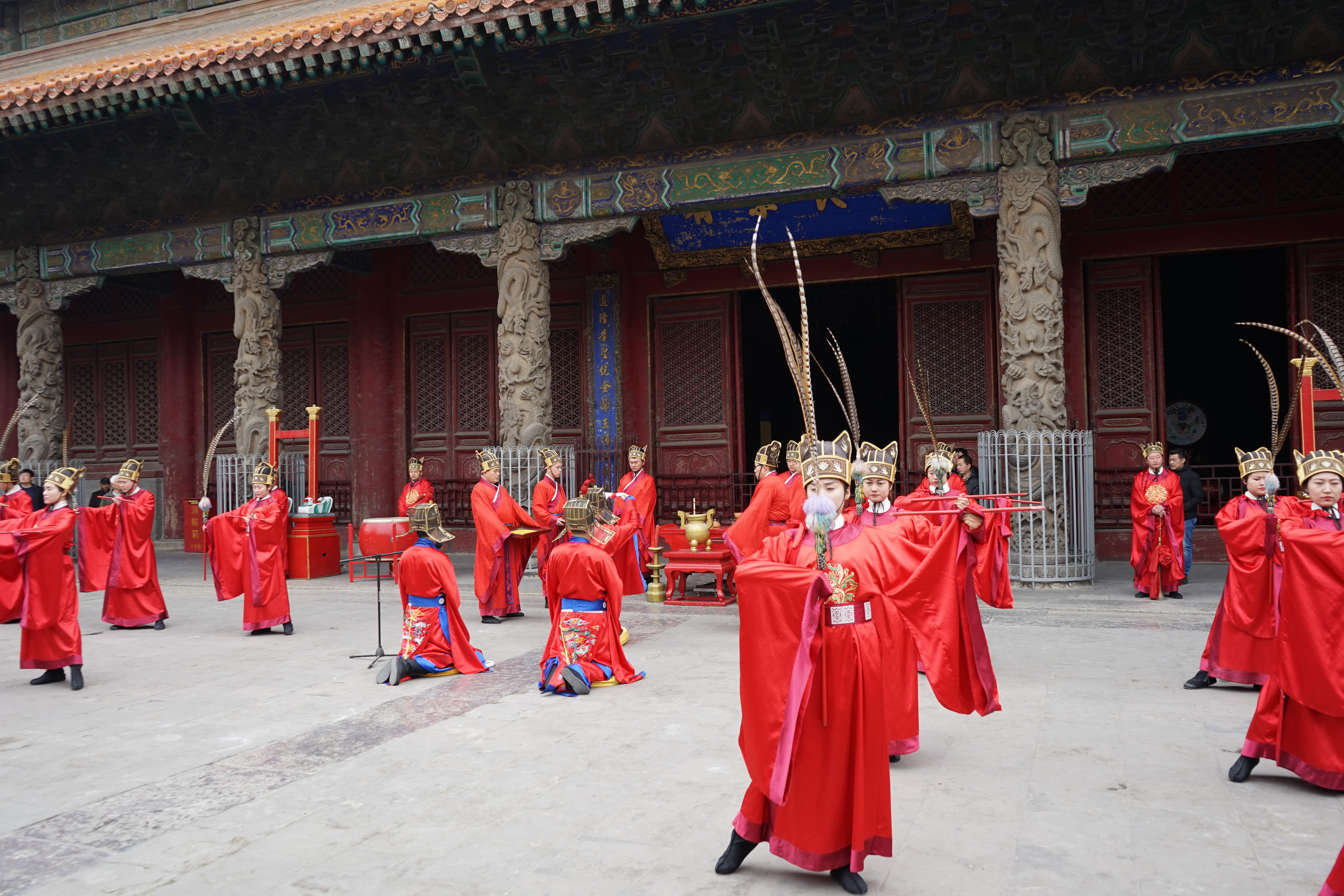
- Confucian rite performed in 2017 at Qufu Confucian Temple, Shandong province, China.

Chinese name
- Traditional Chinese: 雅樂
- Simplified Chinese: 雅乐
Transcriptions
Standard Mandarin
- Hanyu Pinyin: yǎyuè
- Gwoyeu Romatzyh: yeayueh
- Wade–Giles: ya^{3}-yüeh^{4}
- IPA: [jà.ɥê]
Yue: Cantonese
- Yale Romanization: ngáah-ngohk
- Jyutping: ngaa^{5}-ngok^{6}
Southern Min
- Tâi-lô: ngá-ga̍k
Middle Chinese
- Middle Chinese: ngǽ-ngæ̀wk
Old Chinese
- Baxter–Sagart (2014): *N-ɢˤraʔ [ŋ]ˤrawk

Vietnamese name
- Vietnamese: nhã nhạc
- Hán-Nôm: 雅樂

Korean name
- Hangul: 아악
- Hanja: 雅樂
Transcriptions
- Revised Romanization: aak
- McCune–Reischauer: aak

Japanese name
- Kanji: 雅楽
Transcriptions
- Romanization: gagaku

Yayue (Chinese: 雅樂; lit. 'elegant music') was a form of classical music and dance performed at the royal court and temples in ancient China. The basic conventions of yayue were established in the Western Zhou. Together with law and rites, it formed the formal representation of aristocratic political power.

The word ya (雅) was used during the Zhou dynasty to refer to a form of song-texts used in court and collected in Shijing. The term yayue itself appeared in Confucius's Analects, where yayue was considered by Confucius to be the kind of music that is good and beneficial, in contrast to the popular music originated from the state of Zheng which he judged to be decadent and corrupting. Yayue is therefore regarded in the Confucian system as the proper form of music that is refined, improving, and essential for self-cultivation, and one that can symbolize good and stable governance. It means the kind of solemn ceremonial music used in court, as well as ritual music in temples including those used in Confucian rites. In a broader sense, yayue can also mean a form of Chinese music that is distinguishable from the popular form of music termed suyue (俗樂) or "uncultivated music", and can therefore also include music of the literati such as qin music.

Although the court yayue declined after the end of the Qing dynasty and largely disappeared from public eye in China, modern attempts at its reconstruction and revivals had begun during the end of the 20th century. In Taiwan yayue is still performed as part of a Confucian ceremony, and in China a revived form are performed at cultural events and also serves as entertainment for tourists. Other forms of yayue are still found in parts of East Asia, notably the gagaku in Japan, aak in Korea, and nhã nhạc in Vietnam. Although the same word is used in these countries (but pronounced differently), the music does not necessarily correspond to Chinese yayue. The Korean aak, however, preserved elements of older forms of Chinese yayue.

== History ==
According to tradition, yayue was created by the Duke of Zhou under commission from King Wu of Zhou, shortly after the latter's conquest of Shang. Incorporated within yayue were elements of shamanistic or religious traditions, as well as early Chinese folk music. Dance was also closely associated with yayue music, each yayue piece may have a ceremonial or ritual dance associated with it. The most important yayue pieces of the Zhou dynasty were the Six Great Dances, each associated with a legendary or historical figure – Yunmen Dajuan (雲門大卷), Daxian (大咸), Daqing (大磬, or Dashao 大韶), Daxia (大夏), and Dahu (大濩), Dawu (大武).

The Book of Rites records a number of situations where yayue might be performed. These included ceremonies in honour of Heaven and Earth, the gods or the ancestors. There were also detailed rules on the way they were to be performed at diplomatic meetings. Yayue was also used in outdoor activities, such as aristocratic archery contests, during hunting expeditions, and after the conclusion of a successful military campaign. Yayue was characterised by its rigidity of form. When performed, it was stately and formal, serving to distinguish the aristocratic classes. It was sometimes also accompanied by lyrics. Some of these are preserved in the Book of Songs.

With the decline of the importance ceremony in the interstate relations of the Spring and Autumn period, so did yayue. Confucius famously lamented the decline of classical music and the rites. Marquess Wen of Wei was said to prefer the popular music of Wey and Zheng to the ancient court music, listening to which he may fall asleep.

Much of the yayue of the Zhou dynasty continued into the Qin dynasty. However, some pieces appeared to have been lost or were no longer performed by the Han dynasty, and the content and form of yayue was modified in this as well as the succeeding dynasties. For example, the terrace ensemble (dengge) in yayue involved singings but not string instruments in the Han dynasty, and in Sui dynasty, singers and string instruments were added to the court ensembles. During the Tang dynasty components of popular music were added to yayue. However, the dominant form of music in the Sui and Tang court was the entertainment music for banquets called yanyue (燕樂), and the term yayue became reserved for the music of Confucian rituals used in temples of the imperial family and the nobility as well as in Confucian temples.

During the Song dynasty, with Neo-Confucianism becoming the new orthodoxy, yayue was again in ascendancy with major development, and a yayue orchestra in this era consisted of over 200 instrumentalists with many instruments added to the orchestra. Two important texts from the Song dynasty describing yayue performances are Zhu Xi's Complete Explanation of the Classic of Etiquette and Its Commentary (儀禮經傳通解) and Collection of Music (樂書) by Chen Yang (陳暘). In 1116, a gift of 428 yayue instruments as well as 572 costumes and dance objects was given to Korea by Emperor Huizong upon request by the Emperor Yejong of Goryeo. As a result, elements of yayue music from previous Chinese dynasties are still preserved in Korea including two melodies.

Yayue in a Confucian ritual
A short excerpt of a historical recording of yayue c. 1925 used in a Confucian ritual before such music disappeared from mainland China.

Some forms of yayue survived for imperial ceremonies and rituals until the fall of the Qing dynasty when the imperial period of China came to an end. Yayue however was still performed as part of a Confucian ritual in China until the Communist takeover in 1949, where it disappeared as a practice. There has been a revival in yayue in Confucian ritual in Taiwan since the late 1960s, and in mainland China since the 1990s. A major research and modern reconstruction of yayue of the imperial court was initiated in Taiwan in the 1990s, and in mainland China a performance of yayue music in 2009 by Nanhua University's yayue music ensemble in Beijing also spurred interest in this form of music. There are however questions over the authenticity of these revived and recreated yayue music and dances, especially the use of modern forms of instruments and various substitutions rather than the more ancient and original forms, nonetheless some argued that such music and dances have always changed over time through succeeding dynasties, and that any changes introduced in the modern era should be seen in this light.

== Performance ==
2023 news footage of a Confucian ritual performed by school children at Ciyun Temple in Taipei, Taiwan.

The court yayue orchestra may be divided into two separate ensembles that may represent the yin and yang, a smaller one (the yin) that was meant to play on the terraces of a building and called dengge (登歌), and a larger one (the yang) that performed in the courtyard called gongxian (宮懸). The smaller ensemble consisted of mainly chordophones (such as qin and se zithers) and aerophones (such as the dizi and xiao flutes, and panpipes), as well as singers. The larger ensemble was primarily instrumental and contained all the categories of musical instruments with the musicians arranged in five directions (four points of the compass and the center) in the courtyard. The wind instruments occupied the center, and the bronze bells and stone chimes (known collectively as yuexuan 樂悬) at the four sides, while the drums occupied the four corners. At the front were two wooden instruments, used to mark the start and end of a piece. The "outside" music in the courtyard was meant for the praise of heaven, and the size and disposition of the orchestra varied with the importance of the occasion, while the "inside" music was used to extol the virtue of the emperors and their ancestors.

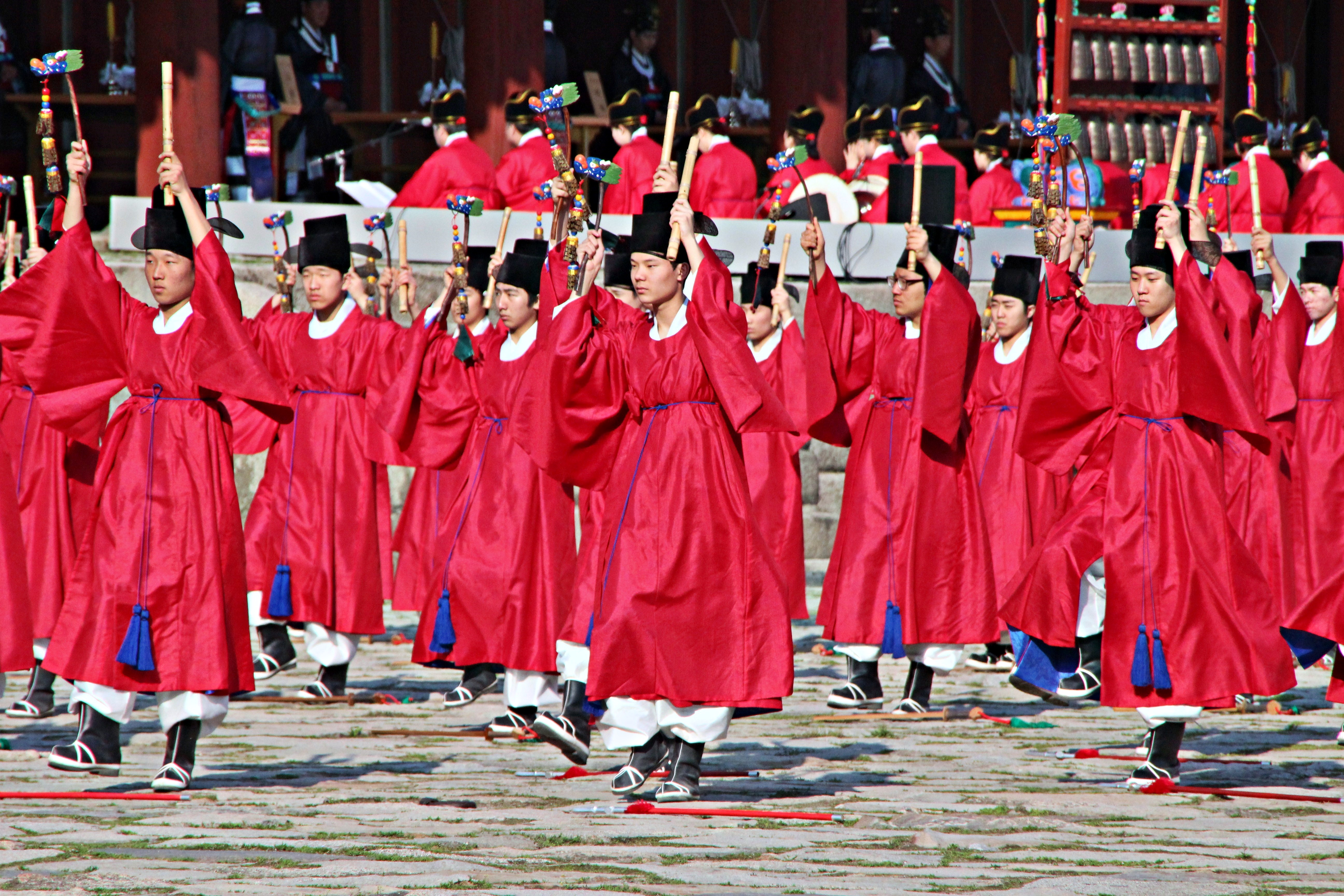
A dance performed at the Jongmyo jerye in the Confucian Jongmyo temple in Korea

The music is typically slow and stately, and monophonic with little rhythmic variety. When sung, there may be four to eight beats per phrase depending on the number of words in the text. The music performed in the courtyard is accompanied by dances, and the number of dancers varies strictly according to the rank and social status of the patron. The emperor may have the largest number of musicians and dancers (64 dancers in eight rows of eight), while a noble or chief minister may have a smaller ensemble and 36 dancers (six rows of six), and lesser officers even fewer (four by four or two by two). In Confucian rituals the six row dance (六佾舞) was originally performed as appropriate for the status of Confucius, later the eight row dance (八佾舞) was also performed as Confucius had been granted various posthumous regal titles, for example the title of King Wenxuan (文宣王) that was granted by Emperor Xuanzong of Tang dynasty. The dances are divided into two types: civil dance and military dance. In civil dance, the dancers hold a yue flute (籥) in their left hands and a feather plume (羽) in their right, while in military dance the dancer may hold a shield (干) in their left hands and a battleaxe (戚) in their right hands.

== Instruments used ==
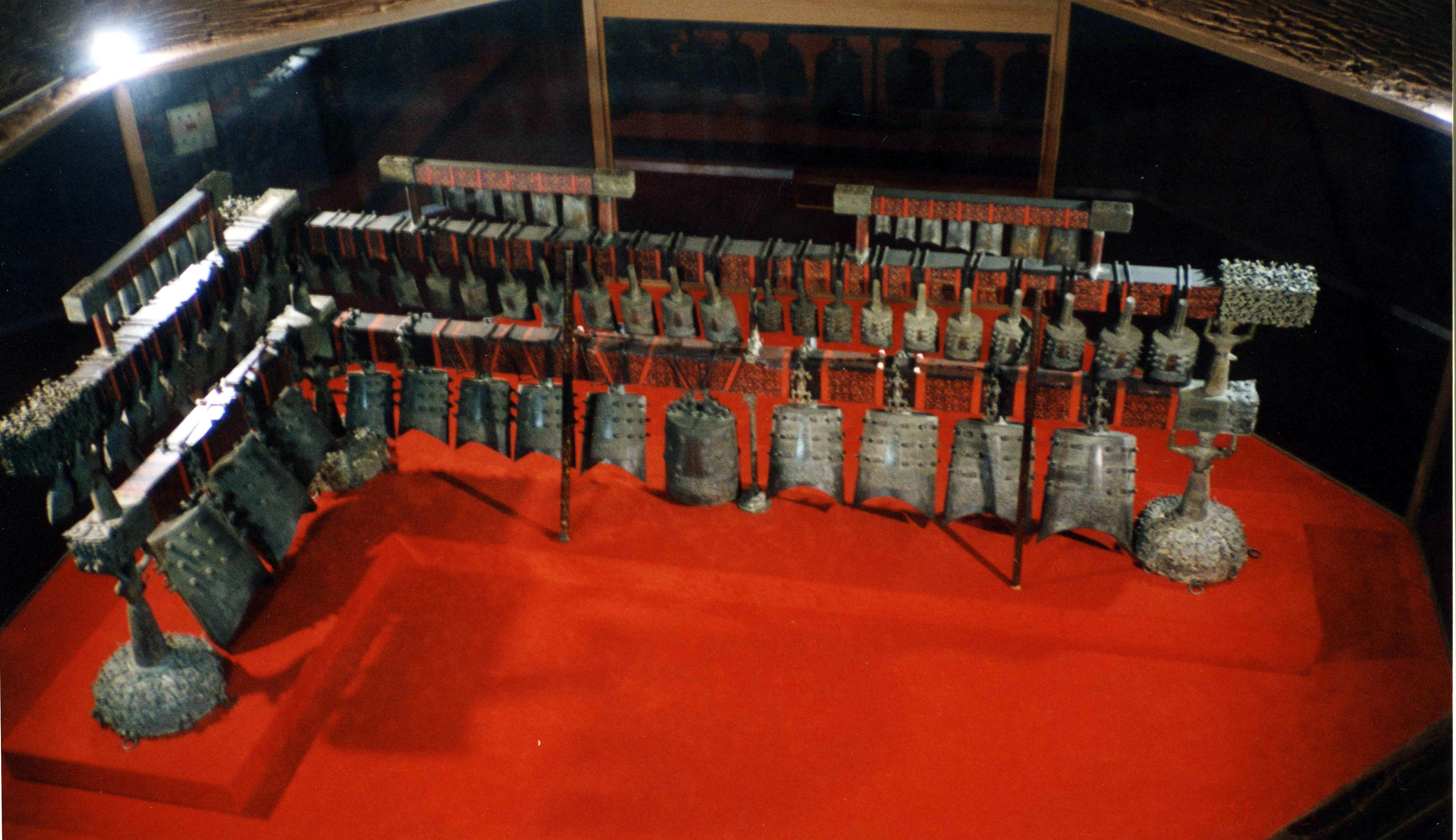
Set of bronze bells (Bianzhong) from the Tomb of Marquis Yi of Zeng, dated 433 BC.

Yayue music does not use just any kind of traditional Chinese musical instruments, but instead includes only a small selection, taken from the oldest ones, according to the eight categories of materials used in their construction.

=== Silk (絲) ===
- Gǔqín (古琴) – Seven-stringed fretless zither
- Sè (瑟) – 25 stringed zither with moveable bridges (ancient sources say 13, 25 or 50 strings)

=== Bamboo (竹) ===
- Dízi (笛子) – Transverse bamboo flute
- Xiāo (簫) – End-blown flute
- Páixiāo (simplified Chinese: 排箫; traditional Chinese: 排簫) – Pan pipes
- Chí (篪) – Ancient Chinese flute

=== Wood (木) ===
- Zhù (柷) – A wooden box that tapers from the bottom, played by hitting a stick on the inside, used to mark beats or sections
- Yǔ (敔) – A wooden percussion instrument carved in the shape of a tiger with a serrated back, played by running a stick across it and to mark the ends of sections

=== Stone (石) ===
- Biānqìng (simplified Chinese: 编磬; traditional Chinese: 編磬) – A rack of 16 hung stone tablets (usually Nephrite) struck using a mallet

=== Metal (金) ===
- Biānzhōng (編鐘) – 16 gilt bronze bells hung on a rack, struck using a mallet
- Fāngxiǎng (simplified Chinese: 方响; traditional Chinese: 方響) – A set of tuned metal slabs (metallophone)

=== Clay (土) ===
- Xūn (塤) – Ocarina made of baked clay

=== Gourd (匏) ===
- Shēng (笙) – A free reed mouth organ consisting of varying number of bamboo pipes inserted into a gourd chamber with finger holes
- Yú (竽) – An ancient free reed mouth organ similar to the sheng but generally larger

=== Hide (革) ===
- Gǔ – (鼓) – Drum

== Yayue in East Asia ==
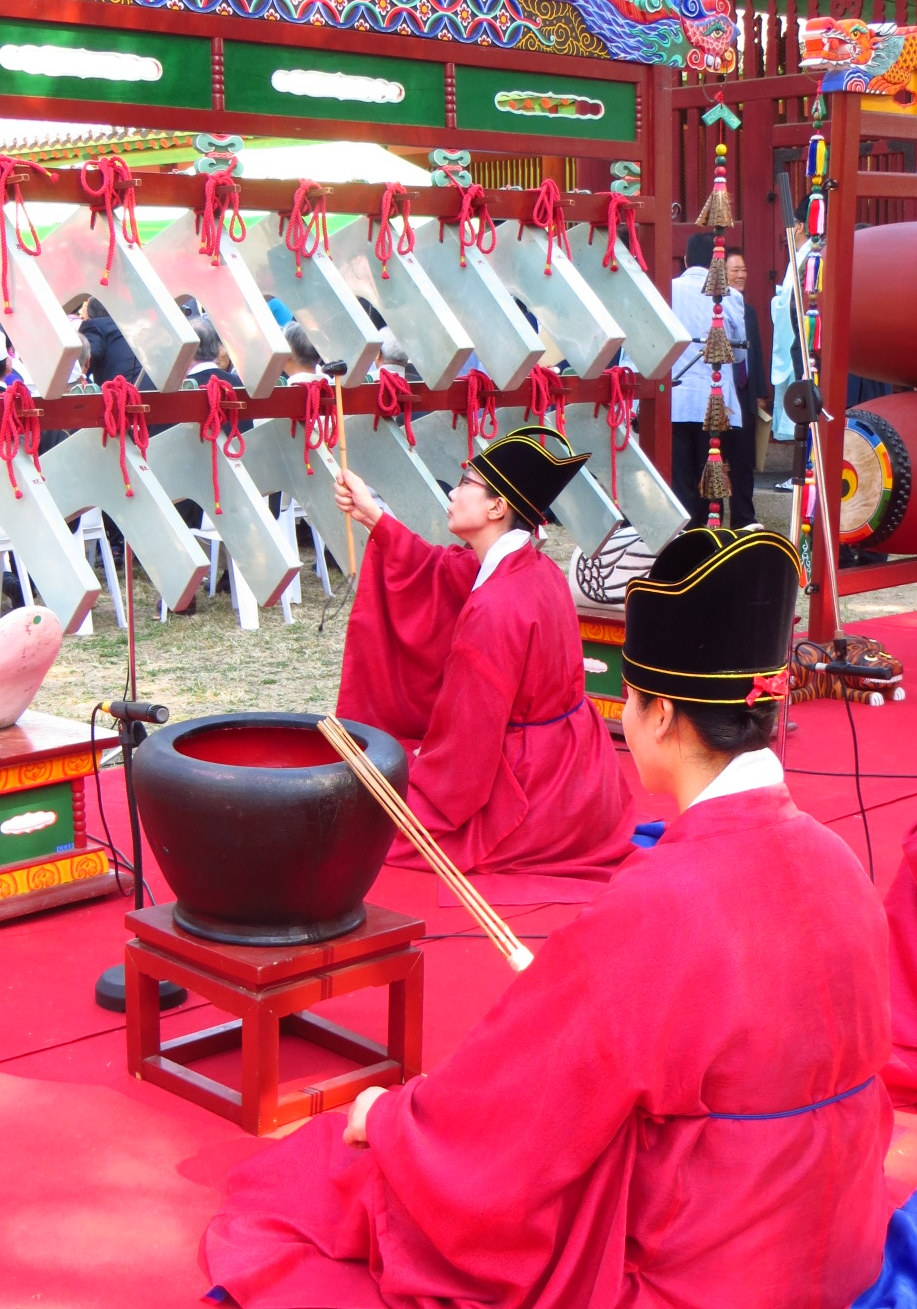
Korean aak musicians striking pyeongyeong (derived from bianqing), and a clay pot called bu (derived from fou) during a Confucian ritual at the Munmyo Shrine, Sungkyunkwan seowon, Seoul

In Chinese, Japanese, Korean, and Vietnamese, the Chinese characters yayue (雅樂) are pronounced differently. The form and content of yayue in these countries may differ in significant aspects.

=== Japan ===
Gagaku is a type of Japanese classical music that has been performed at the Imperial court for several centuries. It differs in form and content from the Chinese yayue, and consists of native Shinto religious music and folk music, a Goguryeo and Manchurian form, called komagaku, and a Chinese and South Asian form, called togaku.

=== Korea ===
In Korean, Yayue is called 아악 (Aak). It was brought to Korea in the 12th century during the Song dynasty and it still preserves some elements of Chinese yayue from previous dynasties.

=== Vietnam ===
In Vietnam, Yayue is pronounced Nhã nhạc. It was brought to Vietnam around the Song dynasty and was mainly influenced later by the Ming dynasty court of China. This began to flourish even more after the Lê dynasty through to the Nguyễn dynasty, which ended in the 20th century. It is still being performed in the city of Huế.

== See also ==
- Beiguan music (北管)
- Dance in China
- Dangak
- Guoyue (國樂)
- History of Chinese dance
- List of Chinese musical instruments
- Music of China
- Nanguan music (南管)
- Taoist music
