= Sogak =

- Hangul: 속악
- Hanja: 俗樂
- RR: sogak
- MR: sogak

Sogak is an abbreviation of pungsogeumak, which means music that expresses people's emotions. It represent one of the two categories of the traditional Korean court music from Joseon Dynasty. It includes genres such as hyangak, dangak and sinak. The terms were used during the Goryeo and Joseon periods.

== See also ==
- Korean culture
