= Yak (instrument) =

Traditional Korean end-blown flute

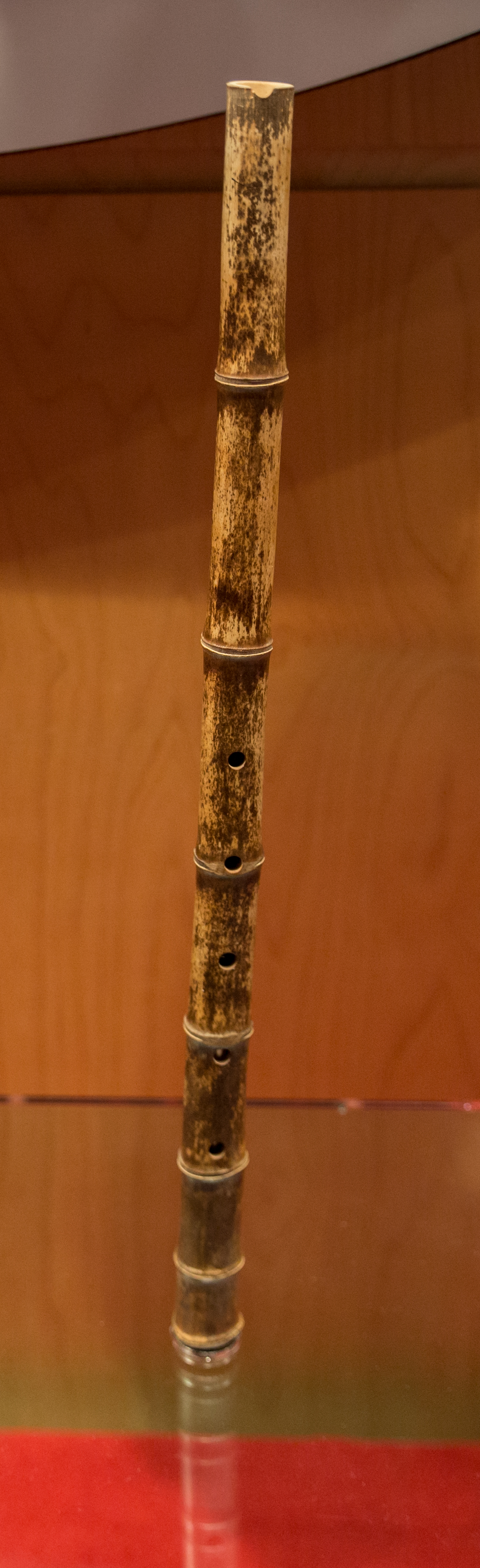

The yak (Korean: 약) is a small flute used vertically, which has three holes and is used in court music. It is a wind instrument, a small carved instrument, which was imported from China in 1116 (the eleventh year of Goryeo's King Yejoing period). This wind instrument was called a wiyak because it was made of reeds, not bamboo. It is currently made of thick yellow bamboo. It is used for Aak (hanja: 雅樂), and according to the instrument classification method, it belongs to Jukbu (竹部) or Gongmyeong instrument (共鳴樂器).

The yak has only three holes, but can play all 12 different shades. Originally an instrument used in the Chinese "aak", the yak arrived in Korea during the Koryo dynasty and was used during the performance of cultural dances. The yak was originally formed from a reed plant, but is now built primarily of wood. Today, the yak is used in the execution of the rituals of the Shrine of Confucius. Due to these typing difficulties, it is only used for very slow music without grace notes. It is currently used as a dance and music tool for ancestral rituals of scholars.
