= Akjang =

Korean court music lyrics

Akjang (Korean: 악장; Hanja: 樂章) is the lyrics of Korean court music. It was most popular during the Joseon period of Korean history.

== History and characteristics ==
It is certain that akjang existed well before the Joseon dynasty period, but the works of ancient kingdoms were lost. It is assumed by scholars that the first akjang could have been a song titled Dosolga (도솔가, 兜率歌), from 28 AD.

In the Goryeo period, original akjang were composed to court music, or folk songs were adapted, but these works did not survive. Thus what usually akjang refers to in its surviving form is lyrics accompanying early Joseon court music. The words are completely deprived of emotions, and focus on praising the rulers and ethical statements of Confucianism, therefore it is considered to be a didactic form of art. Kings were portrayed as heroes in these songs, as part of a Confucian political idealism.

Akjang is not considered to be a unified literary genre, because it is very diverse in language, form and even length. There are several works written in Chinese characters, as well as in Hangeul. Some akjang were written along the form of gyeonggichega (경기체가) (a genre of song), like Sangdae byeolgok (상대별곡, "Song of the Censor") in 1419 and Hwasan byeolgok (화산별곡, "Song of Hwasan") in 1425.

Despite its versatility, it is still considered to be a separate genre because of its social function as being performed at ceremonies.

Akjang started to decline at the end of the 15th century as Joseon kings solidified their rule and Confucianism was widespread, therefore there was no need to convince the people about Confucianism anymore, since there were no competing ideologies.
