= Jeongak =

Classical genre of Korean traditional music

- Hangul: 정악
- Hanja: 正樂
- RR: jeongak
- MR: chŏngak

Jeongak (lit. "proper music") is a classical genre of Korean traditional music, in contrast with minsogak or Korean traditional folk music. The genre has traditionally been associated with the nobility and upper classes.

The best known pieces of jeongak are Sujecheon and the suite entitled Yeongsan Hoesang (영산회상; 靈山會相). Another commonly performed jeongak suite is called Cheonnyeonmanse (천년만세; 千年萬歲).

Jeongak includes court music (국중음악; gungjung eumak) and chamber music (풍류음악; pungryu eumak).

== See also ==
- Joseon Dynasty
- Korean court music
- Korean culture
