= Yoon-Ji Lee =

South Korean composer

- 이윤지
- Occupation: Composer
- Employer: New York University; Berklee College of Music
- Awards: Guggenheim Fellowship (2024)

Academic background
- Education: Ewha Womans University; New England Conservatory of Music; New York University Graduate School of Arts and Science
- Doctoral advisor: Elizabeth Hoffman

Yoon-Ji Lee (Korean: 이윤지) is a South Korean composer based in the United States. A 2024 Guggenheim Fellow, She currently works as an associate professor at the Berklee College of Music.

== Biography ==
Yoon-Ji Lee studied organ, pansori, piano, voice, and violin during her youth. She attended Ewha Womans University, where she obtained her bachelor's degree and New England Conservatory of Music, where she obtained her Master of Music degree in 2006 and her graduate diploma in 2007. She moved to New York University and became a teacher there in 2009, remaining there until 2017. While at NYU, she obtained her PhD in composition and theory at the New York University Graduate School of Arts and Science; her dissertation, centered on the Elliott Sharp composition Then Go, was supervised by Elizabeth Hoffman. She later moved to the Berklee College of Music, becoming associate professor there and teaching composition classes there.

Lee's compositions include non-linear forms of music. Her music was performed at Bargemusic by William Lang in November 2012. In 2018, she collaborated with artists Bang Geul Han and Steven Mygind Pedersen for Sunday Supper, a chamber opera at National Sawdust inspired by the 2007 novel The Vegetarian. In 2019, she performed Angels Broken, a composition with three main sections performed on string and taepyeongso which she said "documents in musical form the history of comfort women", at the From East Asia – Unforgotten Song concert at Brandeis University. Her composition Shakonn, the opening song in Pauline Kim Harris' 2021 album Wild At Heart, was praised by TheWholeNote as "a volcano of sound and energy built over a held bass note, pulling Chaconne apart and transforming it", while Gramophone praised "the juxtaposition of haunting phrases and daunting acrobatics in [her piece] with fearless vibrancy" and Strings Magazine praised "the result [as] exhilarating". In 2024, she was awarded a Guggenheim Fellowship in Music Composition.

As of 2024, she was a resident of Boston.
