= Bak (instrument) =

Korean traditional clapper instrument

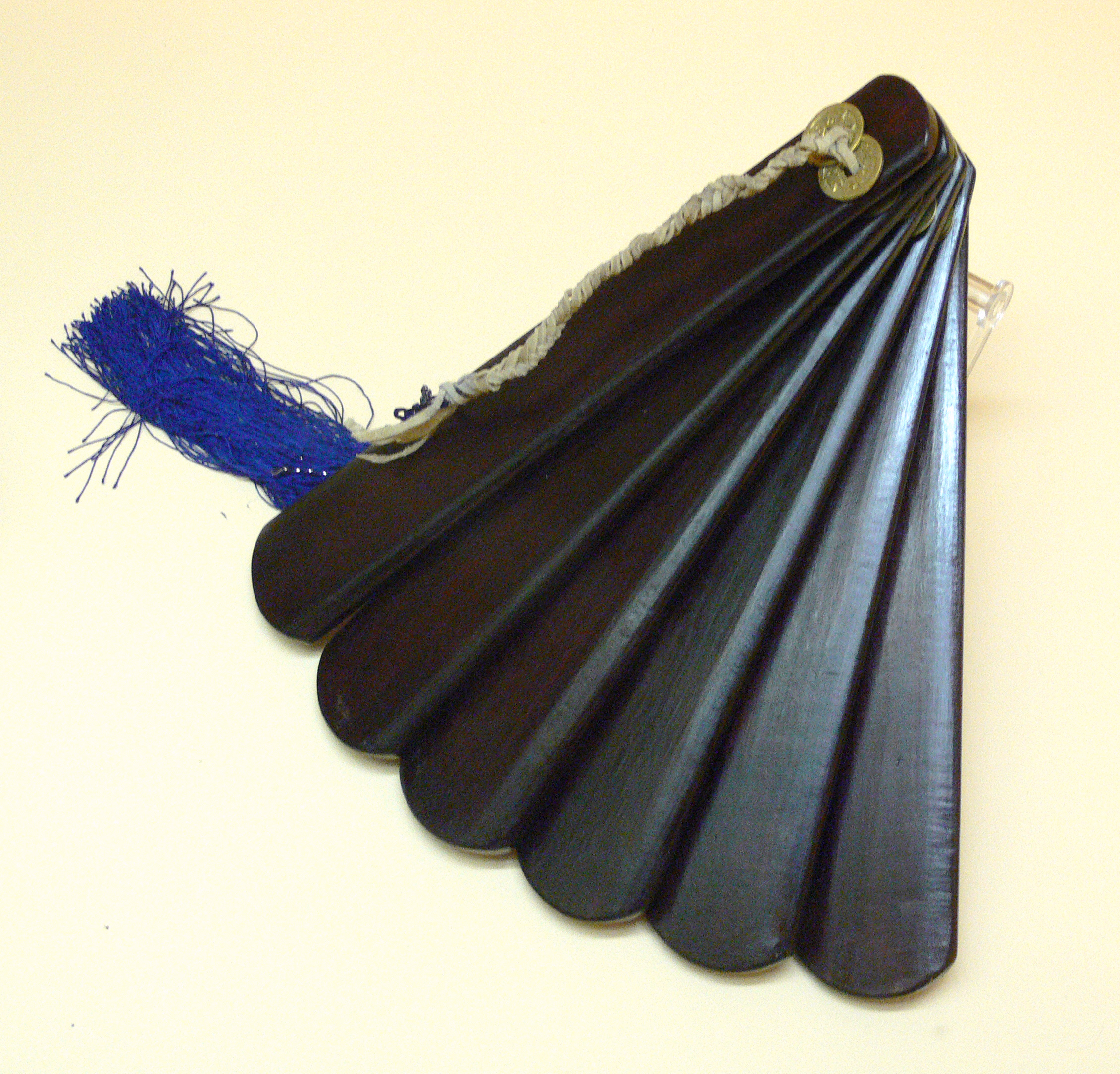
- Bak (Ethnological Museum of Berlin)

Percussion instrument
- Classification: Idiophone
- Hornbostel–Sachs classification: 111.12 (Plaque clappers)
- Developed: Korea

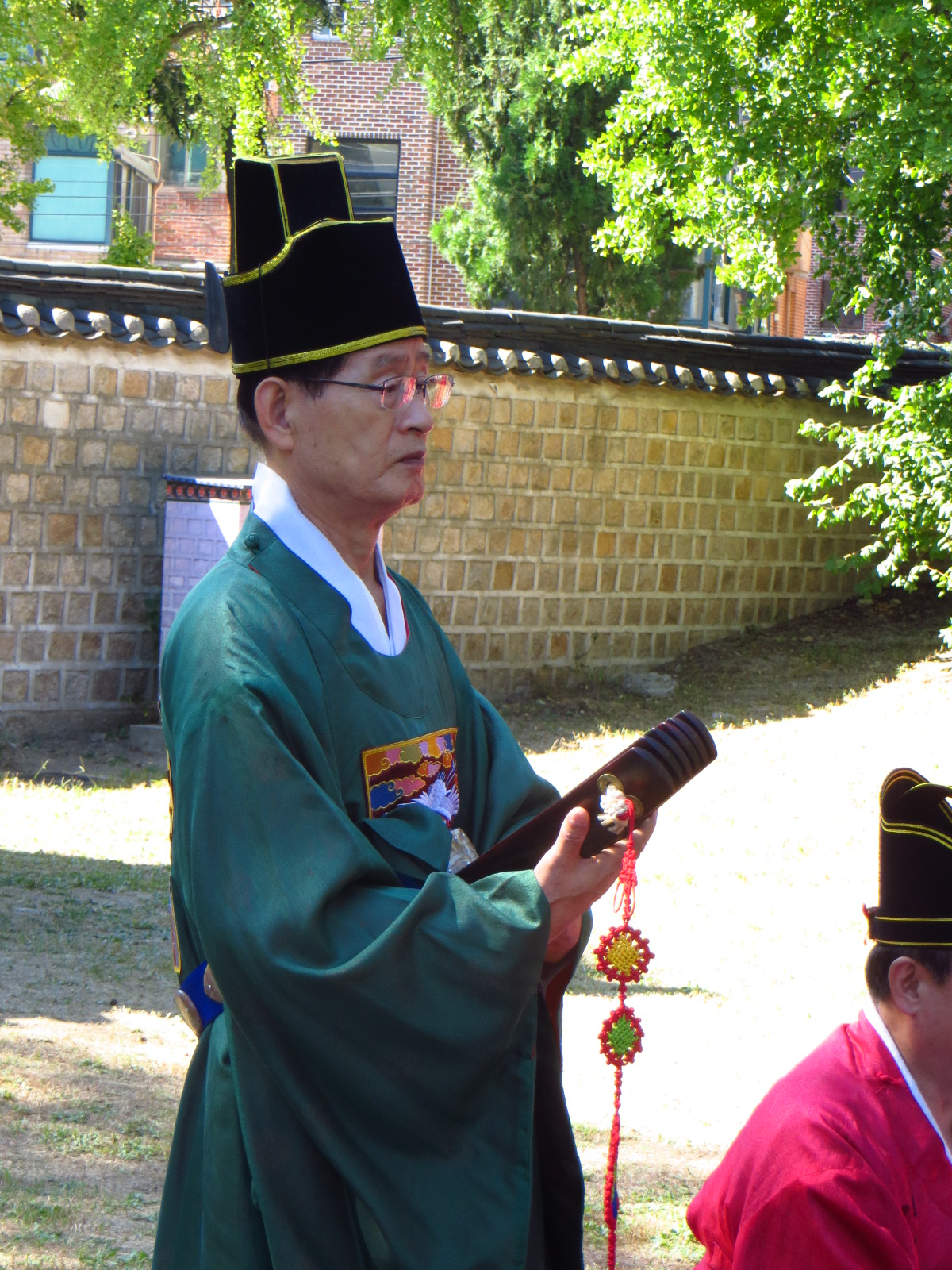
Confucian ritual at Munmyo Shrine, Sungkyunkwan seowon

External audio
- National Gugak Center at YouTube

Bak (Korean: 박; Hanja: 拍) is a wooden clapper used in Korean court and ritual music. The person playing the bak is called jipbak, serving as the conductor or musical supervisor for the group. The bak creates the clapping sound if clapped to indicate when the music starts.

The upper part of the six long and narrow boards are tied with a string, and the lower part is held open with both hands, and then closed rapidly, creating a clear impact sound.

== Construction ==
The bak is made of 6 flat wood boards that are about 13 1/2 in. x 2 3/4 in. The boards are tied together at one end with either string or cord to make a fan shape when spread out.

== Importance ==
There is a record of use since Unified Silla, and it is used for conducting to inform and instruct the progress of music and dance. The jipbak uses the bak to conduct the group, the same way a conductor uses a baton. The bak is sounded when the music starts and ends with three claps and when significant changes occur.

== See also ==
- Traditional Korean musical instruments
- Korean court music
