= Dangak =

Genre of Korean court music

- Hangul: 당악
- Hanja: 唐樂
- RR: dangak
- MR: tangak

Dangak (Korean: 당악) is a genre of traditional Korean court music. The name means "Tang music", and the style was first adapted from Tang Dynasty Chinese music during the Unified Silla period in the late first millennium. It was continued through the Goryeo (918–1392) and Joseon (1392–1910) dynasties, when, along with hyangak and aak it was one of the three approved genres of court music. Dangak performances were accompanied by Tang-style dances known as dangak jeongjae.

Together with hyangak, during the Joseon Dynasty dangak performances were the charge of the Jeonakseo (전악서; 典樂署; 1394–1457) and later of the Jangagwon (장악원; 掌樂院), the court office of music. Performers of hyangak and dangak were drawn from the lower classes, in contrast to performers of aak.

One of the most famous pieces in the dangak repertoire is called Nakyangchun (낙양춘; 洛陽春; lit. '"Spring in Luoyang"'). The American composer Lou Harrison, who studied traditional music in South Korea in 1941, created an arrangement of this work. The Korean composer Isang Yun also composed a contemporary orchestral work entitled Loyang, in 1962.

Nakyangchun and a second piece, Boheoja (보허자; 步虛子; lit. 'Pacing the Void'), are the only surviving pieces of Dangak music.

== See also ==
- Yayue
- Aak
- Hyangak
- Korean culture
- Korean music
- List of musical genres
- Tōgaku
- Taoist music
- Guoyue
- Nhã nhạc
