= Boheoja =

Korean court music

Boheoja (Korean: 보허자; Hanja: 步虛子; lit. "pacing the void") is a Korean court music repertoire originated from China. It was introduced from the Song dynasty during the Goryeo dynasty period, which at the time was ruled by King Yejong.

Categorized as sa (詩; poetry), the repertoire is poetry based-musical orchestra. Introduced collectively with another Chinese piece called Nakyangchun (Spring In Luoyang), Bohoja now is only preserved in Korea and vanished in China. There are 2 versions of Boheoja: Boheosa, version played by combination of wind and string instruments. Boheosa is an original version with 7 stanzas and 82 melodic lines. The second version is Boheoja which have been shortened with only 3 stanzas and 29 melodic lines. In Goryeo and Joseon dynasty, Boheoja was played as accompaniment of banquets and dances. Instruments used in Boheoja are dangpiri (Chinese piri), janggu (hourglass-shaped drum), daegeum (large bamboo flute), dangjeok (small Chinese flute), haegeum (2 stringed fiddle), jwago (seated-drum), ajaeng (bowed-zither), pyeonjong (metal bells), and pyeongyeong (stone bells).
