= Aak =

Court ceremonial music of Korea

- Hangul: 아악
- Hanja: 雅樂
- RR: aak
- MR: aak

Aak (Korean: 아악; Hanja: 雅樂; Korean pronunciation: [a.ak̚]) is a genre of Korean court music. It is an imported form of the Chinese court music yayue, and means "elegant music". Aak was performed almost exclusively in state sacrificial rites, and in the present day it is performed in certain Confucian ceremonies.

Aak in Korea was facilitated and adapted through the gifting of instruments from a Chinese emperor to Korea in the 12th century. Due to Japanese occupation in the 20th century, performances of aak were limited to The Sacrifice to Confucius and The Sacrifice to Royal Ancestors.

== Background ==
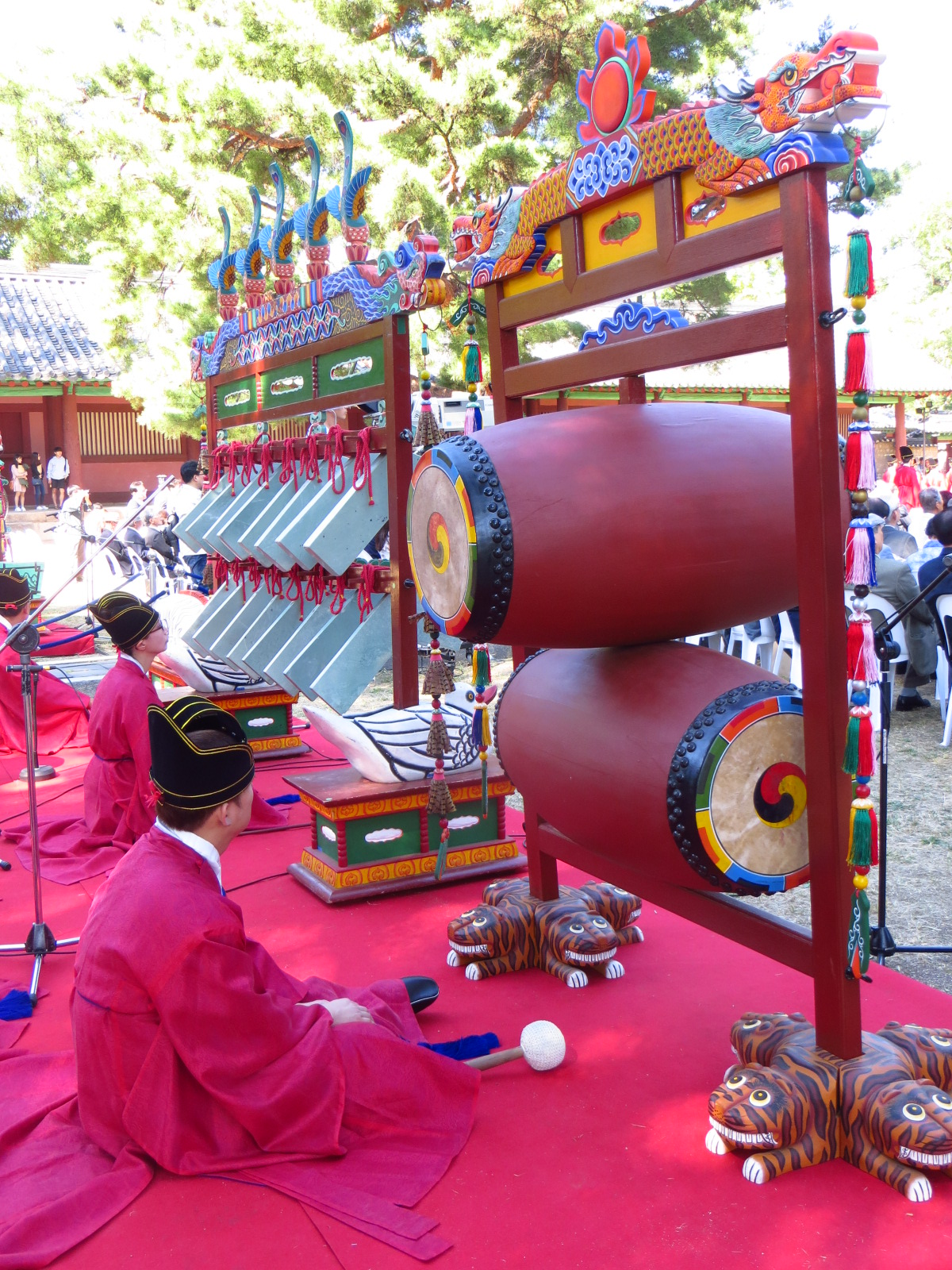
Aak musicians at the Confucian ritual of Munmyo Shrine, Sungkyunkwan seowon

Aak is one of three types of Korean court music; the other two are dangak and hyangak. Aak is similar to dangak in that both have Chinese origins. All the instruments used in aak are derived from Chinese originals, and very few of these are used in other kinds of traditional Korean music. Aak was first performed at the Royal Ancestral Shrine in the Goryeo period as ritual music of the court. The definition of aak later became narrowed to music for Confucian rituals, although aak in its broadest sense can still mean any kind of refined or elegant music and therefore can arguably encompass dangak and hyangak.

The music is now performed by members of the Kungnip Kugagwon National Center for Korean Traditional Performing Arts in Seoul, Korea.

== History ==
=== Koryô Dynasty ===
Aak was brought to Korea in 1116 through a large gift of 428 musical instruments, as well as 572 costumes and ritual dance objects from China, a gift to Emperor Yejong of Goryeo from Emperor Huizong of Song. The number of performers in Korea's aak ensembles were reduced to 190 from the 400 required for China's ensembles. Many of the musical pieces and instruments originally brought from China would eventually be lost to deterioration and the 1361 invasion of Red Turbans from China.

=== Joseon Dynasty ===
A restoration of aak occurred in the 15th century during the Joseon Dynasty, led by King Sejong in an effort to promote Confucianism. This revival of aak tradition was based upon Chen Yang's writings on court ensemble Yueshu or "Treatise on Music", Lin Yu's court music notation Dasheng yuepu or "Collection of Dasheng Music", and Aak Po or "Treatise on Ceremonial Music" (a chapter of the Sejong Annals), showing little resemblance to the aak performances of the previous dynasty. This caused a further decrease in the number of performers to about 20, notably without any singers or stringed instruments. The aak tradition suffered loss again due to invasions of the Manchu and Japanese in the 16th century, not returning until the late 17th century.

=== Modern Period ===
In 1910, Korea was annexed by Japan, causing the abolishment of the majority of court music pieces, leaving only the Confucian rites: The Sacrifice to Confucius and The Sacrifice to Royal Ancestors. These continue to be the only surviving pieces from the 20th century through present times, though The Sacrifice to Royal Ancestors has not been considered to be part of aak since the 15th century.

== Performance ==
The music is now highly specialized, and it is played only at certain ceremonies, in particular the Seokjeon Daeje held each spring and autumn at the Munmyo shrine in the ground of Sungkyunkwan University in Seoul to honour Confucius. It may also be performed at special concerts.

There are two instrumental ensembles – a "terrace" or tȗngga ensemble located on the porch of the main shrine, and a "courtyard" or hôn'ga ensemble located near the main entrance in front of the main shrine building. The music performances or munmyo jeryeak may be accompanied by dances called munmyo ilmu. There are two forms of dances; one a "civil" dance, the other a "military" dance, performed by 64 dancers in an 8x8 formation.

== Sound ==
The modern repertoire of aak consists of just two different surviving melodies. Both the two surviving pieces have 32 notes that last around 4 minutes when performed, and one of the two is performed in a number of transpositions. The two ensembles perform in alternating turns, playing in musical keys with pitches corresponding to the concept of yin and yang from Confucian philosophy, the tȗngga ensemble in 'yin' key and the hôn'ga ensemble in the 'yang' key. The music is played very slowly. Each note is drawn out for around four seconds, with the wind instruments rising in pitch at the end of the note, giving it a distinctive character. This rise in pitch is believed to have been introduced in the 20th century, influenced by Chinese musical practice.

== Instruments ==
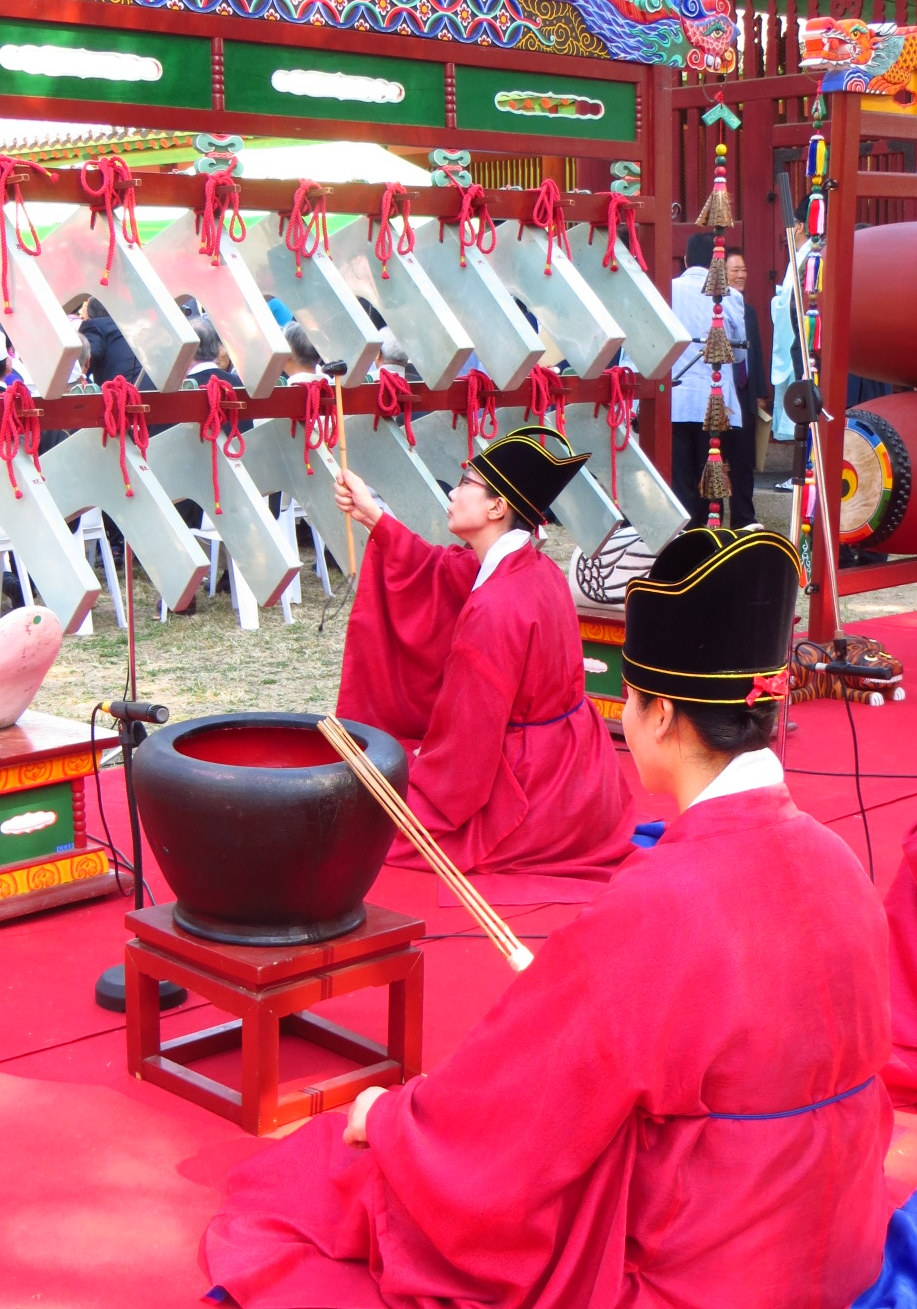
Bu and Pyeongyeong played in aak during Confucian ritual performance at Munmyo Shrine

Instruments utilised in aak music are classified by their primary materials through a system of Chinese origin, referred to as p'arum or the "eight sound" system. The eight types of instrument under the p'arum system: bamboo, wood, metal, silk, skin, stone, gourd, and clay.

The instruments used in the performance of The Sacrifice to Confucius are limited to the types of instruments present in Emperor Huizong of Song's gift to Korea's King Yejong of Goryeo, many of which only remain in use for aak. The construction practice used in the instruments present in aak is based upon a measurement system of Chinese origin where the instrument's pitches correspond to the measurements of Emperor Huizong's finger. This practice introduced by the Dasheng Institute was abandoned in China but remained in practice in Korean court music.

=== List of instruments ===
==== Bamboo ====
- Ji (instrument) – aerophone
- Yak (instrument) – aerophone
- Jeok (instrument) – aerophone
- So – aerophone

==== Wood ====
- Bak (instrument) – idiophone
- Bu (instrument) – idiophone
- Chuk (instrument) – idiophone

==== Metal ====
- Pyeonjong – idiophone

==== Silk ====
- Seul – chordophone
- Geum – chordophone

==== Stone ====
- Pyeongyeong – idiophone

== Players ==
- Lee Ju-hwan

== See also ==
- Akhak Gwebeom
- Culture of Korea
- Gagaku
- Jongmyo Jeryeak
- Korean music
- Nhã nhạc
- Traditional Korean musical instruments
