= National Gugak Center =

Institution for traditional Korean music

The National Gugak Center
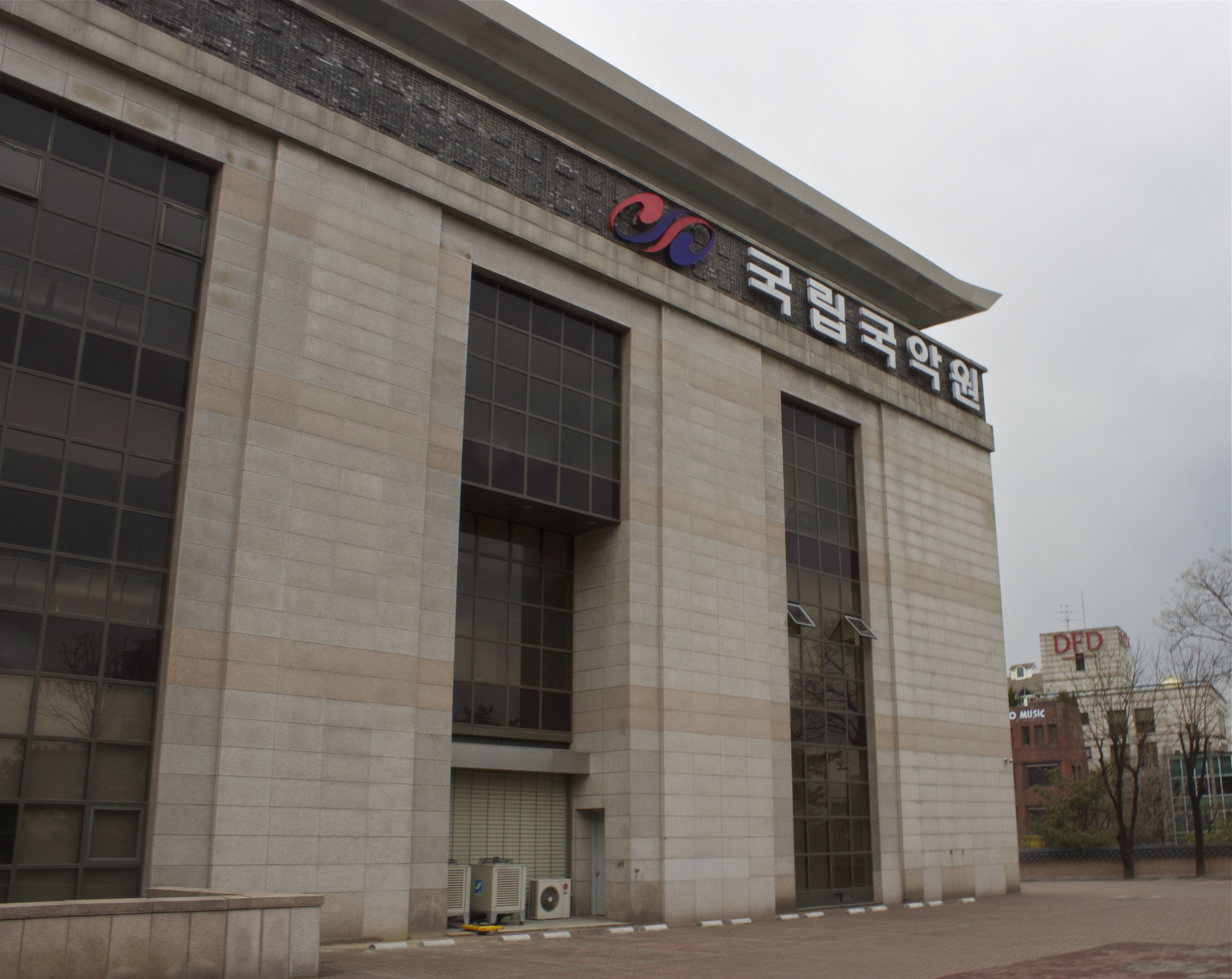
- Interactive map of The National Gugak Center
- Former names: The National Center for Korean Traditional Performing Arts
- Location: Seocho-dong, Seocho-gu, Seoul, South Korea
- Coordinates: 37°28′39.50″N 127°0′3″E
- Type: Performing arts center
- Event: Traditional Korean music (gugak)

Construction
- Opened: January 19, 1950; 76 years ago

Website
- gugak.go.kr

- Korean name
- Hangul: 국립국악원
- Hanja: 國立國樂院
- Revised Romanization: Gungnip Gugagwon
- McCune–Reischauer: Kungnip Kugagwŏn

The National Gugak Center (Korean: 국립국악원), located in Seoul, South Korea, is the primary institution of learning for Korean traditional music (gugak), including both court music and folk music. It was founded in 1951 through a merger of Korean musical organizations.

It is dedicated to "preserving and promoting traditional Korean music." Through academic courses, private study, ensembles, research, and performances, it preserves Korea's ancient musical traditions, including the ancient court ritual music called aak as well as the ritual music performed for the Jongmyo (royal ancestral shrine) and the Munmyo (Confucian shrine).

== Historical musical organizations ==
While Korean court music dates back to the Eumseongseo music institute of the Silla kingdom in the 7th century, the present National Center for Korean Traditional Performing Arts is the direct successor to the Jangakwon music institution of the Joseon Dynasty. Jangakwon went through various name changes until 1945:

- Jangakwon 장악원 掌樂院 (1470)
- Gyobangsa 교방사 敎坊司 (1897)
- Jangakgwa 장악과 掌樂課 (1907)
- Yiwangjik Aakdae 이왕직아악대 李王職雅樂隊 (1910) ("Music Troupe of the Board for the Yi Household"), after the Japanese colonisation
- Yiwangjik Aakbu 이왕직아악부 李王職雅樂部 (1913) ("Music Department of the Board for the Yi Household")
- Guwanggung Aakbu 구왕궁아악부 舊王宮雅樂部 (1945) ("Music Department of the Former Royal Household") under the US military government.

The Music Department of the Former Royal Household merged with other Korean music organizations in 1951 to form the National Center for Korean Traditional Performing Arts (Gugnip Gugakwon 국립국악원 國立國樂院). In 2010 the English name was officially shortened to the National Gugak Center while the Korean name remained unchanged.

== Other ==
In 2018, the organization added fifty more types of sounds and instruments to their repertoire as the pop song "Idol", which includes some gugak instruments.

== See also ==
- Traditional music of Korea
- Alan Heyman
