= Bu (instrument) =

Traditional Korean percussion instrument

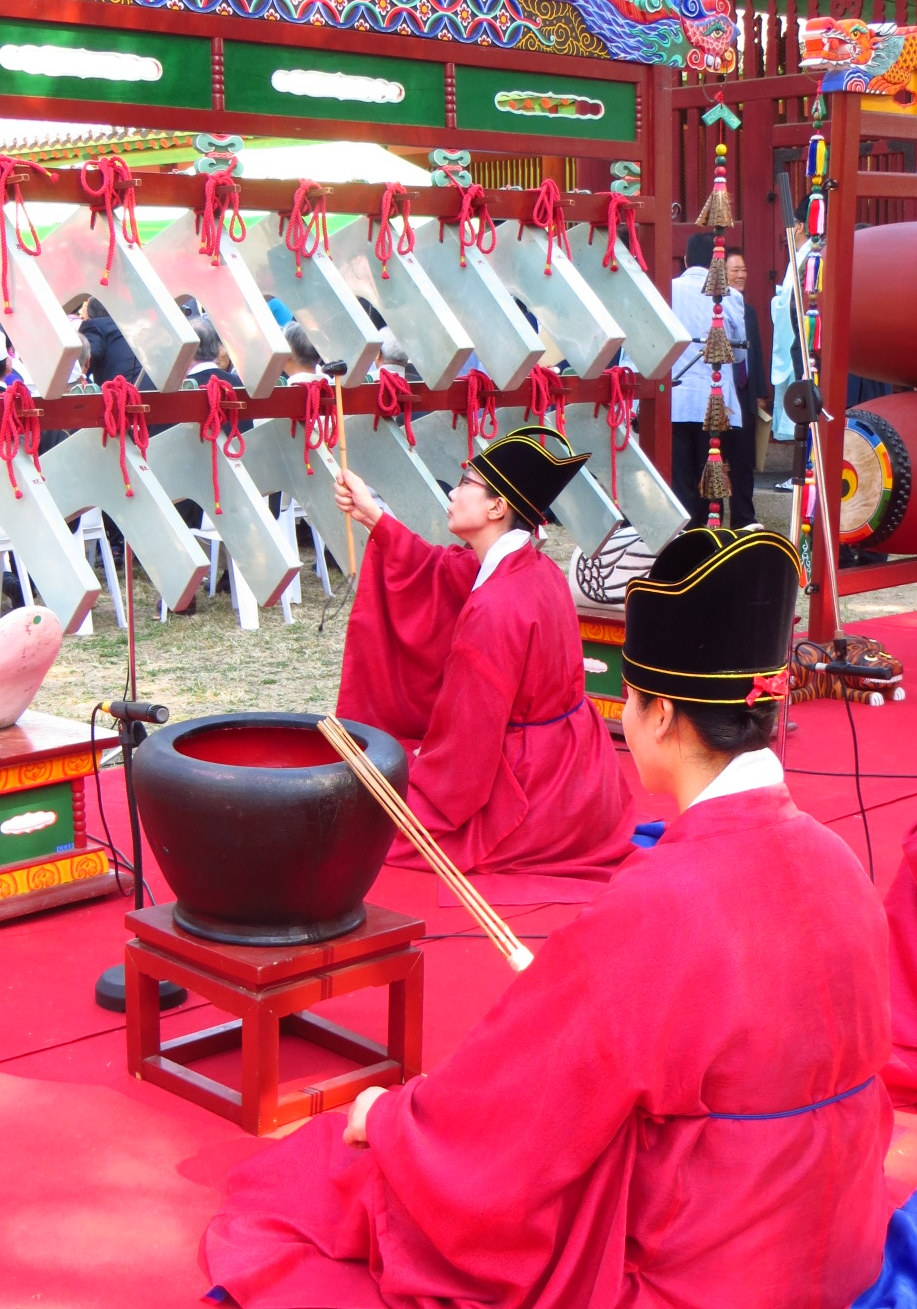
The bu being played during a Korean Confucian rite at Munmyo Shrine, Sungkyunkwan seowon (2015)

The bu (Korean: 부; Hanja: 缶) is a traditional Korean percussion instrument. It is a clay pot that is beaten with a bamboo whisk and used in Korean Confucian court and ritual music. It is derived from the Chinese fǒu.

The instrument was once tuned to various pitches, but now in recreated court rituals is generally only tuned to one pitch.

The bu, and an accompanying instrument, the hun are the "instruments of the 'earth' category", in that "like earthenware ceramics, the hun and bu are shaped from clay and then baked".
