= Paixiao =

Musical instrument

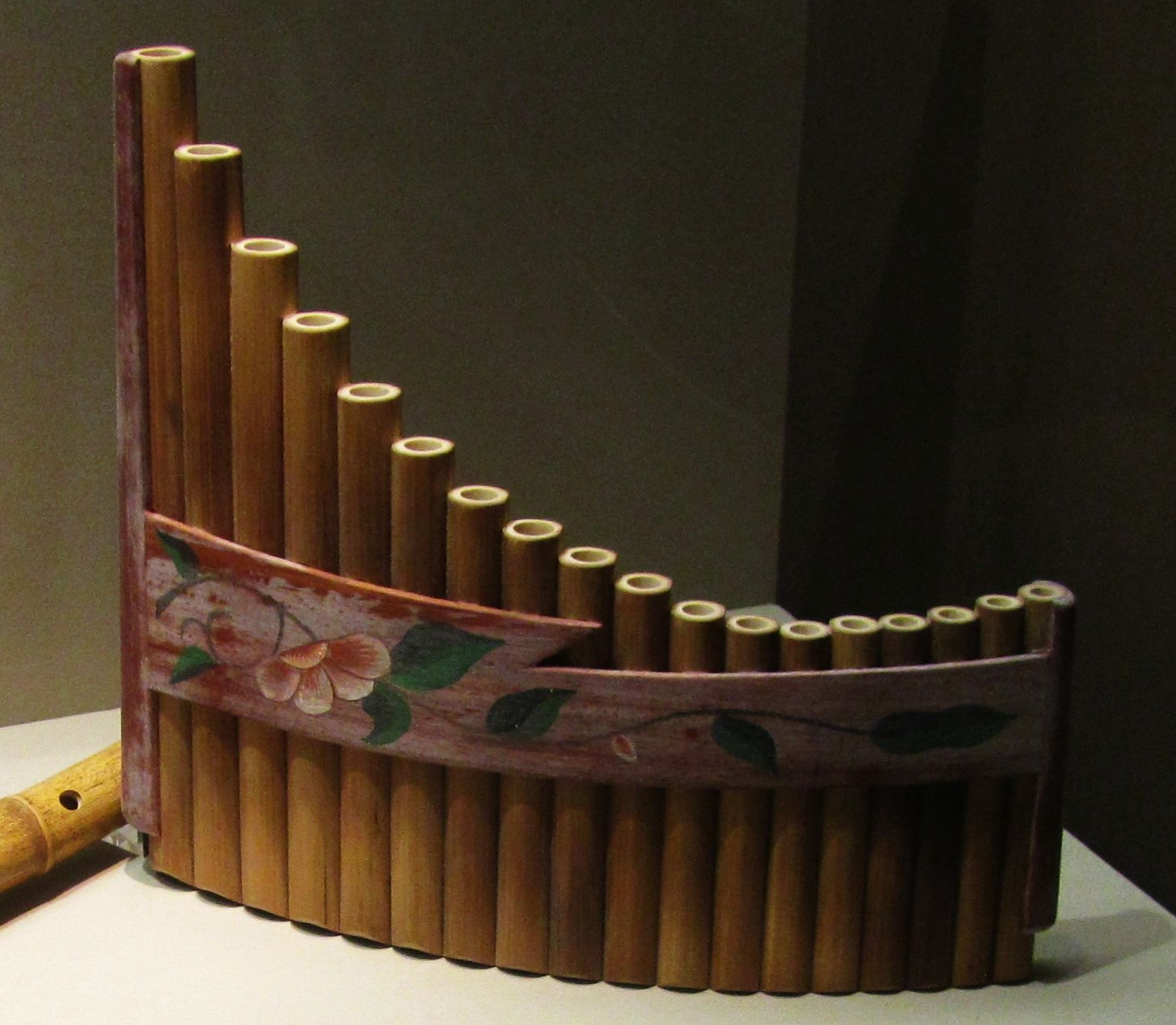
Paixiao of the Tang Dynasty - reproduction

The paixiao (simplified Chinese: 排箫; traditional Chinese: 排簫; pinyin: páixiāo) is a Chinese wind instrument, a form of pan flute. A major difference between the Chinese Paixiao and the panpipes used in European and South American traditions, is that at the top of the Chinese instrument the pipe holes are each cut angled or with notches. This allows for bending the pitch in similar capacity to the dongxiao down a minor second. This allows Chinese paixiao to be fully chromatic without loss in timbre, even though the included pipes are tuned diatonically. The method of blowing so is to hold the head of the frame with both hands, with the mouthpiece facing the front, place the lower lip on the mouthpiece, and find and blow each tube according to the pitch.

In Korea, an instrument called the so (hangul: 소; hanja: 簫) was derived from the paixiao and used in ritual music. The so is made up of 16 bamboo tubes, so each sound is played in one tube.

== History ==
The earliest paixiao discovered so far in the world is the bone paixiao in the early Western Zhou dynasty 3000 years ago.

The two earliest bamboo paixiao, unearthed from the tomb of Marquis Yi of Zeng, are from the Warring States period over 2400 years ago. They are shaped like the wings of a phoenix. They are all made of 13 bamboo tubes of different lengths arranged in turn and wrapped with three bamboo tubes. The surface is decorated with red three corner patterns on a black background. In ancient times, male and female paixiao were often used as ensemble to set off each other, just like male and female duets.

During the 1600 years from the Spring and Autumn period to the end of the Tang dynasty, the number and length of PaiXiao were different, which were spread through the ages and improved by instrumentalists. There are still two paixiao from the Tang dynasty in the Shōsōin Repository of Tōdai-ji Buddhist temple in Nara, the ancient capital of Japan.

In the Institute of Chinese music in Beijing, there is a paixiao made in the Qianlong period (1736–1795) of the Qing dynasty. There are 16 pipes in total. Each pipe is engraved with a sound name. The craft is very exquisite, and the shape is beautiful. There are two golden dragons rising from the clouds on the set frame.

In 1981, Jilin opera house developed the double row and key paixiao. This kind of paixiao has a wide range of sound, which can not only play melodious and soothing music, but also play lively and lively music.

A musician named Gao Ming (高明) plays a version called the paidi in the Tang Dynasty Music and Dance Show at the Shaanxi Grand Opera House in Xi'an; he has been a member of this ensemble since 1982. While his instrument superficially resembles the instrument used during the Tang dynasty, its pipes have ducts rather than being end-blown, it is played with the pipes held horizontally rather than vertically, and it is set up to play in parallel thirds.

== See also ==
- Bamboo musical instruments
- List of traditional Chinese musical instruments
