= Korean court music =

- Stylistic origins: yayue; early Korean music
- Cultural origins: Early 600s – Mid-1400s, Korea
- Typical instruments: piri; daegeum; gayageum; ajaeng

Subgenres
- aak; hyangak; dangak

Other topics
- Korean traditional music; Jeongak; Korean folk music

Korean court music (Korean: 궁중음악; Hanja: 宮中音樂) comprises three main musical genres: aak, an imported form of Chinese ritual music; a pure Korean form called hyangak; and a combination of Chinese and Korean styles called dangak.

Korean court music and its historical origins can be traced back to the Three Kingdoms Period (57 BCE–668), the Unified Silla (668–935), Goryeo (918–1392) and Joseon dynasties (1392–1910). It was partly modelled on the court music of China, known as yayue. Korean court music also shows similarities with the court music of Japan, known as gagaku and of Vietnam, known as nhã nhạc, which also are also derivative of yayue.

Performances in the form of banquet dances typically accompany the court music, in which musical institutions play a role in teaching and training musicians and performers on the forms of traditional Korean dance. The instruments used in Korean court music vary depending on the specific genre but do show various overlaps between the three different types. Traditional court music also continues to show significant cultural influence on contemporary society in South Korea, through government, national music associations, and forms of popular culture such as South Korean music.

== History ==
Korean court music and its origins have been traced as early as the Unified Silla period (668–935); however, the three categories commonly began their spread across Korea during the Goryeo dynasty (918–1392), mainly due to Chinese influence.

=== Aak ===
The genre of aak refers to Korean court ritual music originating from China. Aak means 'elegant music'. It is similar to dangak as both genres are of Chinese origin. The types of Chinese court music within the aak genre included Korean royal processional music, referred to as daechwita; munmyo jeryeak, Confucian shrine music; jongmyo jeryeak, also known as royal ancestral shrine music; hyangak and gagok, translated to the 'classical song cycle'; and dangak. As these forms of court music eventually began to fade away, aak was decidedly later used only for Confucian shrine music. As time went on, it eventually also included forms of music played for aristocrats, nobility and court officials.

The first historical noting of aak was during the Unified Silla period of 668–935; however, this is only due to the existence of aak instruments, and no music or performance coexisted at this time. Aak music and performance began to spread across Korea for the first time during the Goryeo dynasty of 918–1392. Aak was first introduced to Korea during 1116, when the Chinese emperor of the Sung dynasty first presented the Korean court with aak instruments and court dance instructions; Emperor Hyejong of Goryeo provided Emperor Huizong of Song with a gift of 428 music instruments, 572 costumes, and ritual dance objects imported from China. This created the growth in popularity for aak within Korea; however, the genre saw an eventual decline afterwards. The Yi dynasty during 1392–1910 then allowed for a completely finalised version of the aak system to rise across Korea, as the year 1430 saw the revival of the genre through a more modern reconstruction of traditional aak melodies.

Instruments used within the genre are all of Chinese origin and are mostly used for the purpose of playing aak music, as opposed to being used for other genres of traditional court music.

There are only two current surviving melodies of aak, both of which are played very slowly, and last around four minutes. Each piece contains 32 notes, and each note is played for at least four seconds, with the instruments rising in pitch at the end of every note.

=== Hyangak ===
The genre of hyangak refers to court banquet music originating from Korea. Hyangak means 'indigenous/native music, folk music'. During the Unified Silla period of Korea, the genre widely included native Korean court music, along with music imported from China prior to the years of the Tang dynasty. As hyangak includes original Korean music, it is commonly acknowledged as the most prominent genre of court music, and its wider musical range has also led to the preference of Koreans to perform it more frequently than other genres.

Its historical origins trace as far back to the Three Kingdoms period (220 AD – 280 AD). However, the earliest recordings of hyangak were during the 14th century, which was seen through the very first few creations of instrumental hyangak compositions. The 15th century started to see the creation of 24 hyangak compositions in total, and by the year 1434, there were around 80 compositions of hyangak music. During the Unified Silla period of Korea, hyangak was only played alongside dangak. Within the Goryeo dynasty, hyangak was referred to instead as sokak. Some of the genre's musical instruments were derived from the Unified Silla period, including the samhyeon and samjook; however, hyangak was also played with foreign instruments such as the janggu, haegeum and the daegeum. The Joseon dynasty finally saw less of a clear distinction between hyangak and dangak through each genre's direct influence on one another.

Dangak music is typically accompanied with folk dance performances referred to as hyangak chongjae.

One of the most important hyangak pieces is referred to as yeomillak. Other hyangak pieces include pollyeong, haeryeong, and boheoja, all of which are performed in Chinese style.

=== Dangak ===
The genre of dangak refers to Chinese court banquet music in Korea. Dangak means 'Tang music', as the genre was initially used for Chinese court music which originated during the Tang dynasty. However, during the Goryeo dynasty, dangak was then used to refer to music imported from China both during and after the Tang dynasty. The genre was then split into ubangak; music of the right, and hyangak; music of the left.

Dangak originated within the Goryeo dynasty of 918–1392, in which dangak music and performances first began to spread across Korea. During the Yi dynasty of 1392–1910, the genre further developed through an increase in the creation of compositions for instrumental dangak music. Dangak continued to spread in Korea throughout the Goryeo (918–1392) and Joseon (1392–1910) dynasties.

Dangak music is typically accompanied with dance performances referred to as dangak chongjae.

One of the most popular pieces of dangak is commonly known as Nakyangchun, and is one of the two only current surviving pieces of dangak music, of which the other is Boheoja (translated to "Pacing the Void").

== Performance ==
Korean court performances included traditional banquet dances alongside musical accompaniments. Female court entertainers were called kinyo and kisaeng. Male musicians were separated into four different classes: aksaeng, aggong, kwanhyon maengin, and royal processional musicians.

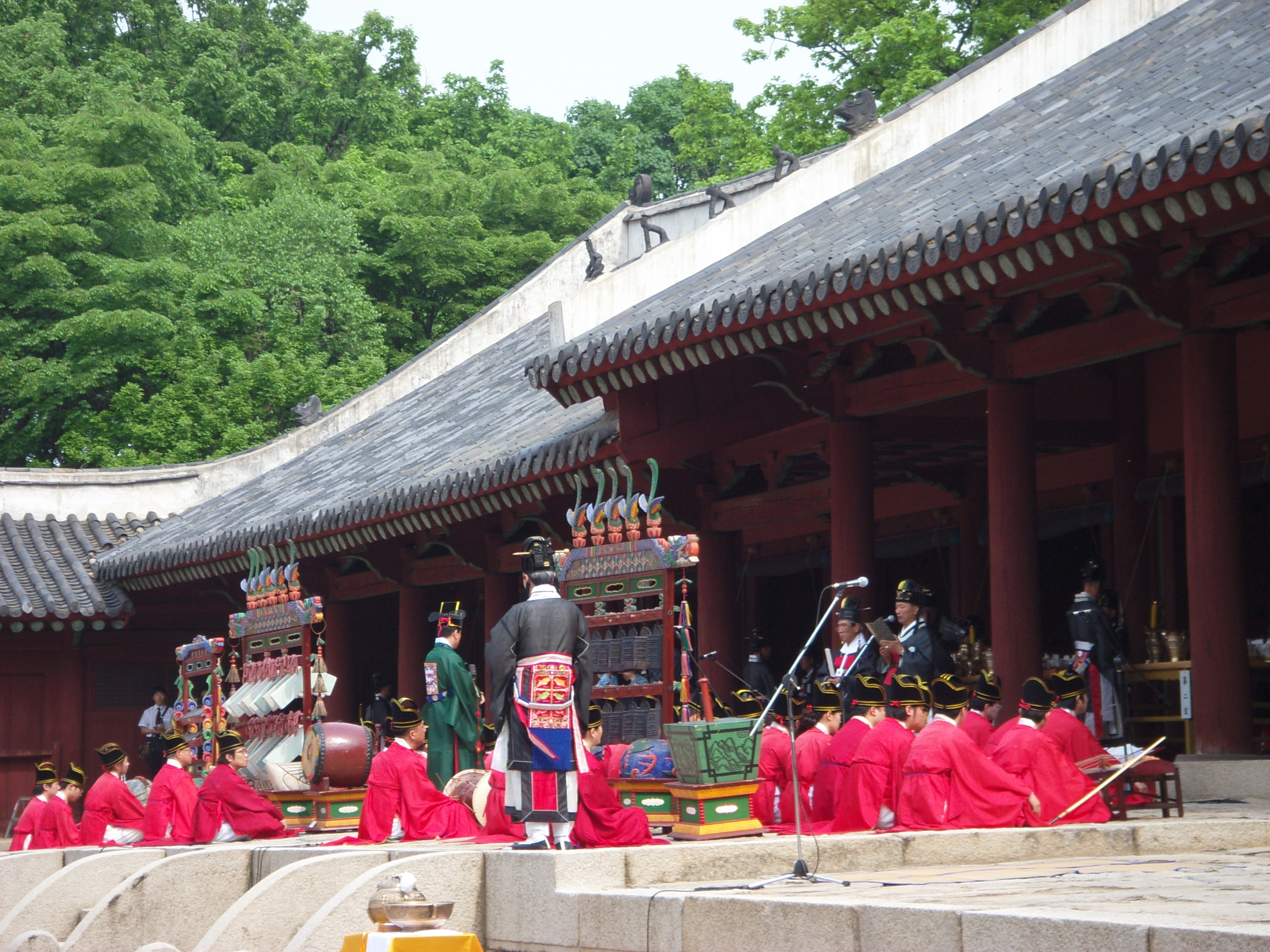
A performance of jongmyo jeryeak at the Jongmyo Daeje (Royal Shrine Ritual).

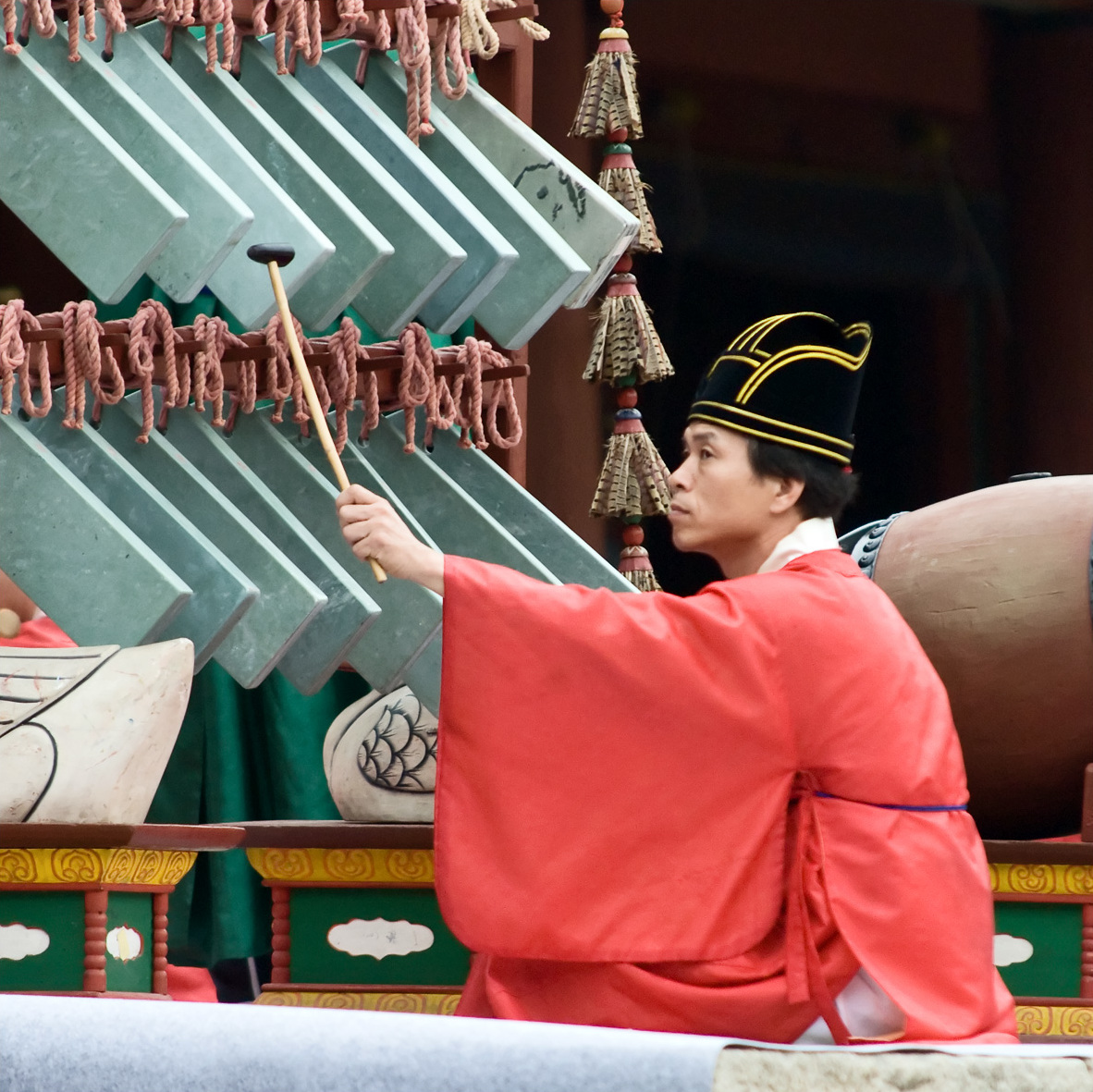
Ancestral rites at Jongmyo Shrine, Seoul with the musician striking the banghyang

=== Aak ===
The first recorded performance of aak was at the Royal Ancestral Shrine during the Goryeo period of Korea.

Modern aak musical performances are known as munmyo jeryeak or jongmyo jeryeak, which contain two instrumental ensembles; the "terrace" group who play on the porch of the main shrine, and the "courtyard" group, who play near the main entrance of the main shrine.

This is typically accompanied by modern dance performances known as munmyo ilmu, which contains two types of dances; a "civil" dance, or a "military" dance, in which 64 dancers perform in an 8 × 8 formation.

Audiences are welcome to watch aak performances at the National Gugak Center in Seoul. Performances are also played at certain ceremonies such as the Seokjeon Daeje, held at the Munmyo shrine of the Sungkyunkwan University in Seoul. This festival is held during the spring and autumn seasons every year as a festival with the purpose to honour Confucius.

=== Hyangak chongjae ===
Hyangak chongjae described banquet dances which were performed alongside hyangak instrumental music. The dance required musicians and entertainers to enter the stage alongside the beat of hyangak music. The entertainers would then pause their dancing, to sing Korean poems. Finally, performers would exit the stage after bowing, which concluded the performance.

=== Dangak chongjae ===
Dangak chongjae described banquet dances which were performed alongside dangak instrumental music. The dance required musicians and entertainers to enter the stage behind pole bearers. The dancers would then read Chinese poems. Finally, performers would exit the stage, concluding the performance. Musicians and performers of dangak chongjae were normally drawn from the lower classes of Korea.

=== Court music institutions ===
Court music institutions also play a heavy role in assisting musicians with their learning processes of Korean court performances.

The first modern theatre built by the royal court was referred to as Hyuomnyulsa. The theatre has since changed its name to Wongaksa.

Currently, court music institutions include the National Center for Korean Traditional Performing Arts and the Chongdong Theater, which foster the preservation and appreciation of traditional court music within contemporary society.

== Instruments used ==
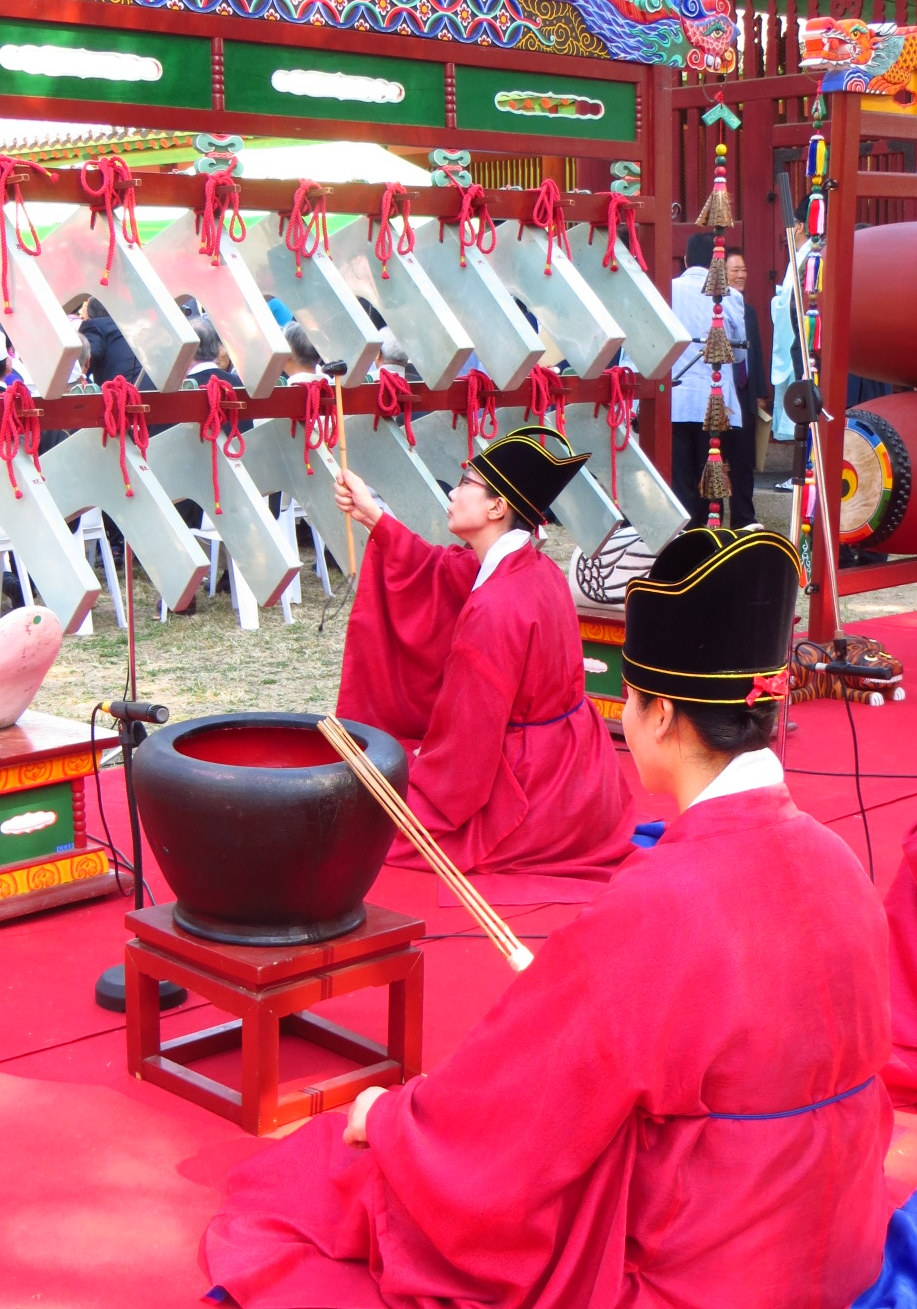
Aak musicians striking the pyeongyeong and bu during a Confucian ritual at the Munmyo Shrine, Sungkyunkwan seowon

The instruments used in Korean court music vary depending on the specific genre; however, they also show various overlaps between the three categories of aak, hyangak and dangak.

=== Aak ===
Instruments used for aak may include the tungga, honga, pyeonjong, pyongyong, kum, sul, saenghwang, and pak, along with the eight necessary types of materials (metal, stone, silk, wood, bamboo, leather, clay and gourd).

=== Hyangak ===
Instruments used for hyangak may include the geomungo, konghu, gayageum, koto, pipa, taegum chunggum, sogeum, pak, taego, piri, janggu, haegeum, junggeum, daegeum, tang-p’iri, tang-jok, and tang-pip’a.

=== Dangak ===
Instruments used for dangak may include the tango, yogo, janggu, pak, shō, hwengjok, tungso, piri, saeng, tang-pip’a, chang, konghu, panghyang, taego, tang-p’iri, ajaeng, kyobanggo, wolgum, haegeum, taepyeongso, pyeonjong, pyonyong, daegeum, and cholgo.

== Cultural influence on contemporary society ==
The word for music in the Korean language is eumak, which very closely resembles the word for the traditional Korean court music form aak. In North Korea, traditional court music and performances have mostly died out as a result of the nation's strong political ideologies. However, traces of its legacy have continued to live on within South Korean culture and as a result, continues to cultivate cultural influence on contemporary South Korean society.

=== National institutions and associations ===
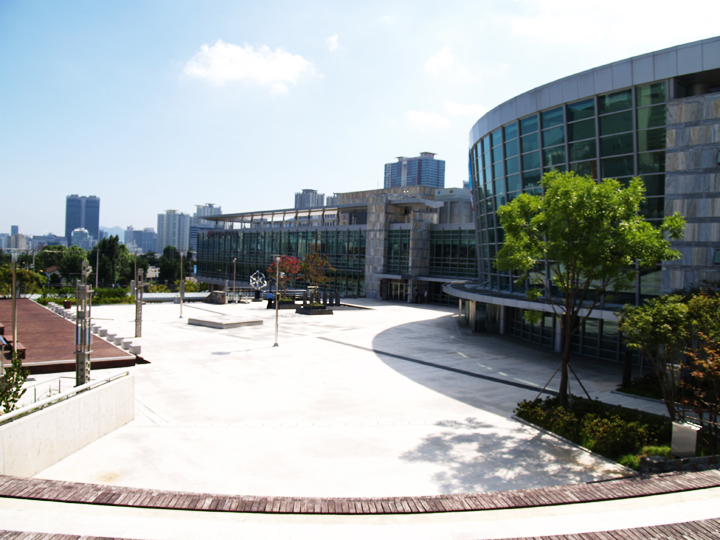
The National Center for Korean Traditional Performing Arts, located in Busan, South Korea

The South Korean government advocates for the preservation of traditional court music within contemporary society. National music institutions such as the National Center for Korean Traditional Performing Arts and the Chongdong Theater, along with associations such as the Korean Music Association and the Korean Vocal Music Association, also contribute to fostering the sustained appreciation of Korean court music within current and future generations.

=== Contemporary South Korean music ===
Popular Korean musicians have also drawn upon Korean court music as sources of inspiration for their songs, such as BTS' Agust D. Agust D's "Daechwita" is heavily inspired by and directly named after and samples the Korean royal processional music genre.

== See also ==
- Akjang, lyrics of court music
- History of Korea
- Korean culture
- Traditional music of Korea
- The National Center for Korean Traditional Performing Arts
- Traditional Korean musical instruments
