= Chi (instrument) =

The chi (Chinese: 篪; pinyin: chí) is an ancient Chinese center-blown transverse flute with closed ends and front finger holes. Later it was followed by the dizi.
