= Taoist music =

Taoist music is the ceremonial music of Taoism. The importance of music in Taoist ceremony is demonstrated by revealing how central beliefs are reflected through elements of music such as instrumentation and rhythm. Expression of spiritual beliefs through music enables followers of Taoism to enhance their path to enlightenment.

== Music in Taoist ceremony ==
Music has long played an integral part in religious ceremonies. In Taoist ceremonies, music has several different functions. Taoists believe that music is a way to speak to the gods, to inspire religious followers and to achieve inner harmony, bringing the listener or participant closer to Tao. To follow Tao is to recognise the inner harmony and balance in all living things. Music is patterned off of "the music of nature", which was the divine "natural notes of the respiration of the earth and the cosmic breath that inspires everything" that adept Taoists can get in touch with.

In the ceremony witnessed at the Evergreen Taoist Church of Australia in Deagon, the birth of Guan Yin, the goddess of mercy was celebrated. Music and instrumentation played a central role in this ritual. The priests sung each chant and prayer to their gods, and accompanied these on musical instruments.

The musical expression of a Taoist ceremony supports the core beliefs of the religion. Firstly, the role of music in the ceremony will be described, showing its religious importance to Taoism. Secondly, this relates the structure of the birth of Guan Yin ceremony to the achievement of Tao. The principal doctrines of Taoism and the roles of the various participants in the ceremony will also be described. Following this, the demeanour of participants and the physical setting of the ceremony will be illustrated. Studying the role of music in Taoist ceremony will demonstrate the importance of music in religion as a means to inspire followers, improve and deepen faith, and enable communication with gods. Describing how the music in the ceremony witnessed communicates and confirms the belief systems of Taoism will reveal music is as intrinsic to the Taoist as the path of Tao itself.

== Background on Taoism ==
Taoism is an ancient Chinese religion and philosophy. It can be traced to a 6th-century B.C. scripture written by Laozi, the Tao Te Ching. The Tao Te Ching translates as "the classic of the way (Tao)". The writings of the Tao Te Ching support passive behaviour and promote natural harmony with nature. The main underlying theme to the writings is the value of wu wei, (non-striving) “by which one returns to a primitive state closer to the Tao”. Taoism has since been influenced by Buddhist ideals, Confucian philosophy and traditional ancient Chinese mysticism.

== Yin and Yang tones ==
The principal belief of the Yin Yang is reflected in the categorisation of musical tones. The two main forms of Taoist music are the Yin Tone and the Yang Tone (). Yin stands for all things that are female and soft and Yang stands for all things male and hard. Through the proper balance of Yin (female) and Yang (male) a Taoist can find harmony and simplicity in all things. Taoists strive to have these cosmic forces within themselves and around them at peace and in balance.

The Yang tone is used in rituals mainly for the benefit of the priests, spirits and gods. The ceremony held to celebrate the birth of the god Guan Yin, one of the deities of Taoism, started with chanting in the Yang tone. The other form, Yin Tone, is music aimed at appeasing and entertaining the general populace. This creates a harmony with the Yang tone, by giving to the people what the Yang tone gives to the gods and priests. Yin tones are usually performed at outer altars to inspire the populace in their beliefs and are livelier and more melodic than Yang tunes. The ceremony of the birth of Guan Yin consisted of elements of both the Yang tone and the Yin tone. This combination of tones symbolizes the balance Taoists strive to achieve.

The Yang tones were initially staged in the hall of the three purities. The three purities are the highest deities in Taoism and they are said to reside over the heavens. The ceremony involved three female priests, two of which wore robes of simple red and black and the main priest wore a richly decorated robe of a jade colour. The priests stood in front of the three purities and read from prayer books before them. The priests maintained this formation throughout the entire ceremony until the end, when the main priest led them in single file around each of the altars in the temple to pay their respects to the other gods.

The ceremony started with the three priests chanting in a mono syllabic, often repeated phrase with only slight melodic deviation from the tonic. The melodic deviation was rising in a pentatonic style chord then dropping in similar pentatonic step wise motion until the melody arrived back at the tonic, in a wave type phrase. Most melodic phrases in the ceremony ended in descending tones, heading back to the tonic (to gain harmony and balance, like yin-yang) before starting the next phrase. Later on, as the ceremony was finishing off, the music strayed from the Yang Tone and headed more towards the Yin tone. The priests made their way around the temple to the other places of worship and the forecourt, for the purpose of the general populace observing the ritual. The prayers in this section were still somewhat intoned. More melodic phrasing was heard and the rhythms became faster and more syncopated. These rhythms, syncopations and melodic ideas all relate to the core belief of Taoism, balance and harmony.

The demeanour and interaction between the priests and worshippers reflected an air of individual focus. The priests were constantly absorbed on the prayers, chanting, and rhythm and ignored all other matters. Many other worshippers came and went as the ceremony progressed and paid their respects to the three purities and the two adjoining altars on either side of the main altar, at which the ceremony was held. The worshippers made no appearance of solemnity towards the ceremony and came and went as they pleased, leaving incense offerings and praying. In the following of Tao, each of these worshippers had their own inner harmony and this in no way intruded on the Tao of the ceremony, or the Tao of the priests.

== Instruments and gestures ==
The priests in the ceremony used a variety of instruments. The main priest used hand movements and ritual objects influenced by Chinese mysticism. These gestures are used in Yang tone ceremonies in combination with magical instruments. Magical instruments are believed to manifest magical powers during rituals. The Yang tone is mainly played with magical instruments such as the Qing (metal bowl) and the Faqi (ritual percussion section). The Faqi often consisted of large drums, bells, and wooden fish blocks called Muyu. These are played to help mediation and to complement the ritual actions of the priests. The musical instruments used in this ceremony, the Qing and the Muyu, are said to be indispensable. These are also used to set the time of the chanting and to add to the religious atmosphere. Through most of the parts of the ceremony a steady beat on the Muyu and Qing accompanied the chanting, with sections between prayers ending with a syncopated rhythm of the Qing and Muyu.

== Themes ==
Music has been established as a key element of Taoist ceremony. By examining the role of music in Taoist rituals, it is evident that instrumentation and vocalisation play central roles. The structure of the event has been shown to symbolise the balance ideal of Taoism. The core concept of Yin-Yang balance has been revealed as a theme that is acknowledged in areas of ceremony such as intonation, melodic deviation, rhythm and form. The conduct of the various participants and the setting of the ceremony have also been outlined. By examining the ceremony of the birth of Guan Yin, at the Evergreen Taoist Church of Australia, it is clear that music is used to guide its followers and practitioners on their path to universal harmony. In the balanced philosophy of Taoism without music there would only be silence, solitary, alone and unbalanced.

== Discography ==
- Levy, John (1970). Chinese Taoist Music from Taiwan (Sound recording). New York, N.Y: Lyrichord. LLST 7223.
