= Hyangak =

Traditional form of Korean court music

- Hangul: 향악
- Hanja: 鄕樂
- RR: hyangak
- MR: hyangak

Hyangak (Korean: 향악; Hanja: 鄕樂; lit. 'domestic music') is a traditional form of Korean court music with origins in the Three Kingdoms period (57 BC – 668 AD). It is often accompanied by traditional folk dances of Korea, known as hyangak jeongjae. These dances are performed in front of audiences—as opposed to the square dance more familiar to Westerners, which is primarily for the participants' enjoyment.

One important hyangak piece is Yeomillak (hangul: 여민락; hanja: 與民樂). Few hyangak pieces are performed in Chinese style; these include Pollyeong, Haeryeong (hangul: 해령; hanja: 解令), and Poheoja

== History ==
During the Unified Silla Period, Hyangak began to be used as a symmetrical concept with dangak. At that time, Hyangak included both native music from the Korean Peninsula and foreign music that had been adopted before the unified Silla Dynasty.

The literature of the Goryeo Dynasty often referred to Korean traditional court music as 'Sokak' rather than 'Hyangak'. During the Goryeo Dynasty, the musical instruments Of Hyangak were composed of Samhyeon and Samjook, which were handed over from the unified Silla, and foreign instruments such as janggu, haegeum, and flute.

In the Joseon Dynasty, Hyangak, and Dangak were influenced musically by one another. Hyangak, the early Joseon Dynasty, was part of a project to honor the historical legitimacy of Joseon and the new dynasty. Since the mid-sized Joseon Dynasty, the contents of the music have changed as the music changed like Hyangak, and the distinction between Hyanggak and Dangak was blurred even when using musical instruments.

== See also ==
- Aak
- Culture of Korea
- Dangak
- Gagaku
- Korean music
- Nhã nhạc
- Yayue
