= Seokjeon Daeje =

Korean Confucian ceremonial right

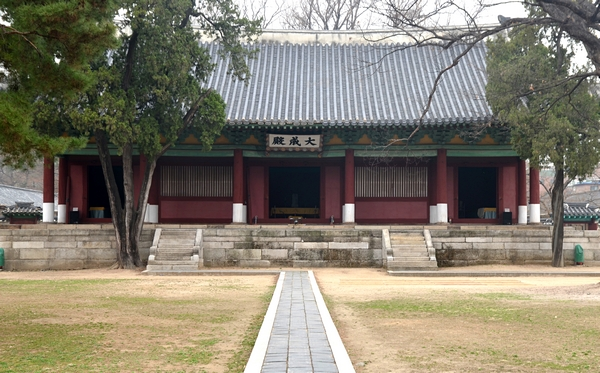
- The Seokjeon Daeje is performed in the grounds of Munmyo.

Korean name
- Hangul: 석전대제
- Hanja: 釋奠大祭
- RR: Seokjeondaeje
- MR: Sŏkchŏndaeje

The Seokjeon Daeje (Korean: 석전대제), also sometimes called Seokjeonje, is a ceremonial rite performed twice annually to honor Confucius. It is held at Confucian sites across South Korea including hyanggyos and the Confucian temple Munmyo located at Sungkyunkwan, on Confucius' birthday in fall and the anniversary of his death in spring. Seokjeon is made up of the two Chinese characters, 釋 (to lay out) and 奠 (alcohol), and Seokjeon Daeje means "Laying out offerings ceremony". It involves an elaborate ceremony with sacrificial offerings of alcohol and foods, as well as an elaborate dance known as munmyo ilmu accompanied by musical performances munmyo jeryeak.

In 2011, Korea nominated the ceremony for the UNESCO Intangible Cultural Heritage list; however, it did not satisfy the criteria for selection and UNESCO invited the Korean government to submit it again in the future with additional information. The ceremony is recognized in Korea as important intangible cultural heritage no.85.

== Procedure ==
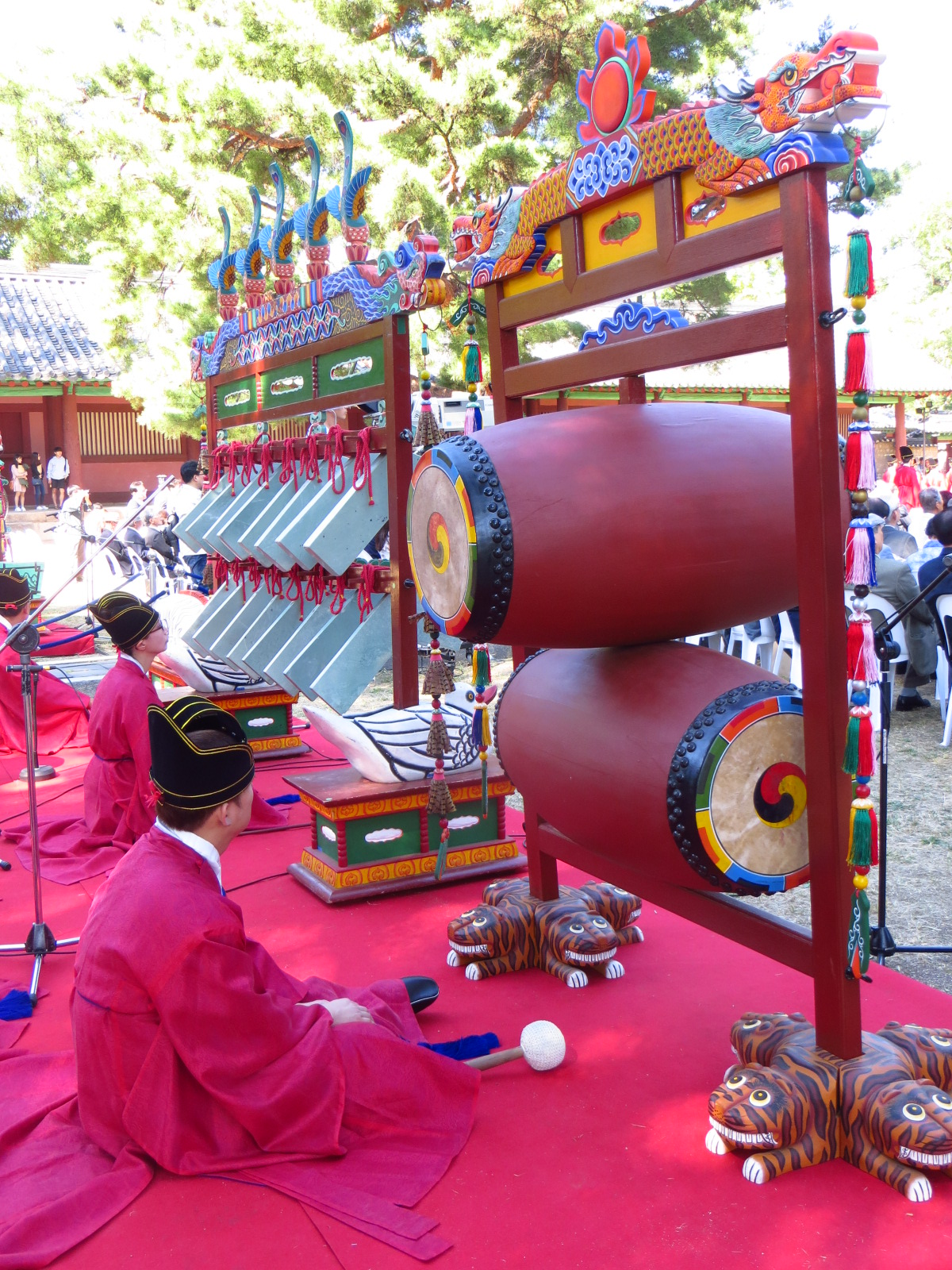
Aak musicians at Munmyo Shrine with stone chimes and drums

The Seokjeon rite resembles a large-scale version of Jesa ancestral funerary rites.

(1) Entrance and preparation: Welcoming the honored spirits by way of the main gate and the spirit path (yeongsin). The master of music leads the musicians and dancers to their places. The usher escorts the Confucian scholars to their places. The usher conducts the reader of the invocation or ceremonial address and the deacons to their places. The reader and the deacons bow four times. The announcer requests that the first offerer opens the ceremony. Music is played by the Ground Orchestra, and the Civil Dance begins

(2) Offerings of Tribute and Sacrificial Food (jeonpyerye) to the spirits of Confucius and the Four Assessors. The first offerer kneels in front of the tablet of Confucius, burns incense three times, offers the sacrifices, and rises. The first offerer proceeds to the tablet of Tseng Tzu, kneels, burns incense three times, offers the sacrifice, and rises. The first offerer proceeds to the tablet of Mencius, kneels, burns incense three times, offers the sacrifice, and rises.

(3) First Wine Offering (choheon). The announcer escorts the first offerer to the wine table for the offering to Confucius. Attendants pour the wine from the cattle-shaped pitcher to the brass cup. They turn the wine cup over to the worshippers. They receive the wine cup and circle the wine cup three times above the smouldering fire.

(4) Music is played by the Terrace Orchestra and the Civil Dance begins. The first offerer offers wine, retreats a few steps, and kneels. The music and dance cease. The reader sits at the left of the first offerer, reads the invocation, and rises with the first offerer. The announcer escorts the first offerer back to his place. Music by the Terrace Orchestra and the Military Dance are performed. rituals at the Confucius shrine, or munmyo, the king's personal presence was not essential. The monarch would send high-ranking officials to honor the rites for Confucius.

(5) The Rite of the Secondary Wine Offering (aheon) The announcer escorts the second offerer to the basin to wash his hands and then to the wine table for offering to Confucius. The announcer escorts the second offerer back to his place.

(6) The Rite of the Final Wine Offering (jongheon) to Confucius and his four assessors, and to the other thirty-four spirits honored in the ceremony. The announcer escorts the last offerer to the basin to wash his hands and then to the wine table for offering to Confucius. Music by the Ground Orchestra and the Civil Dance begin. The last offerer proceeds to the tablet of Confucius, offers wine, and rises. He then proceeds to the wine table for the other four sages. The announcer escorts the last offerer back to his place. The announcer and usher escort the east and west assistant officers, respectively, to the basin to wash their hands, thrice burn incense, and offer wine to each of the eighteen Koreans dedicated on the east and west of the Great Master, as they rise.

== Spirituality ==
Although Confucianism is generally considered an ethical and philosophical system rather than a religion, there are many spiritual aspects of the Seokjeon Daeje relying on belief in ancestral spirits.

The front gate of Munmyo, Sinsammun (spirit-three-gate), is kept closed except during ceremonies such as the Seokjeon Daeje and the Goyurae ceremony which is held for important events such as university graduations at SKKU, matriculation ceremonies, and inaugurations of new university presidents. The central entrance, usually reserved in royal palaces for kings, is intended only for the spirits of Confucius and his disciples. The path known as Yeongshin (spirit path) stretching from Sinsammun to Daeseongjeon is intended only for spirits, and visitors are prevented from crossing it during ceremonies by specially designated workers.

== Munmyo Ilmu ==
The Munmyo Ilmu dance is performed in a grid of 8X8 dancers clad in red robes. Dance steps are slow, deliberate, and solemn. Throughout the ceremony, different hats are worn and different tools are held. Dancers raise their arms to the heavens to welcome spirits to earth, repeating the steps while facing each compass direction. The dance has been performed by SKKU students in recent years.

== Musical instruments ==
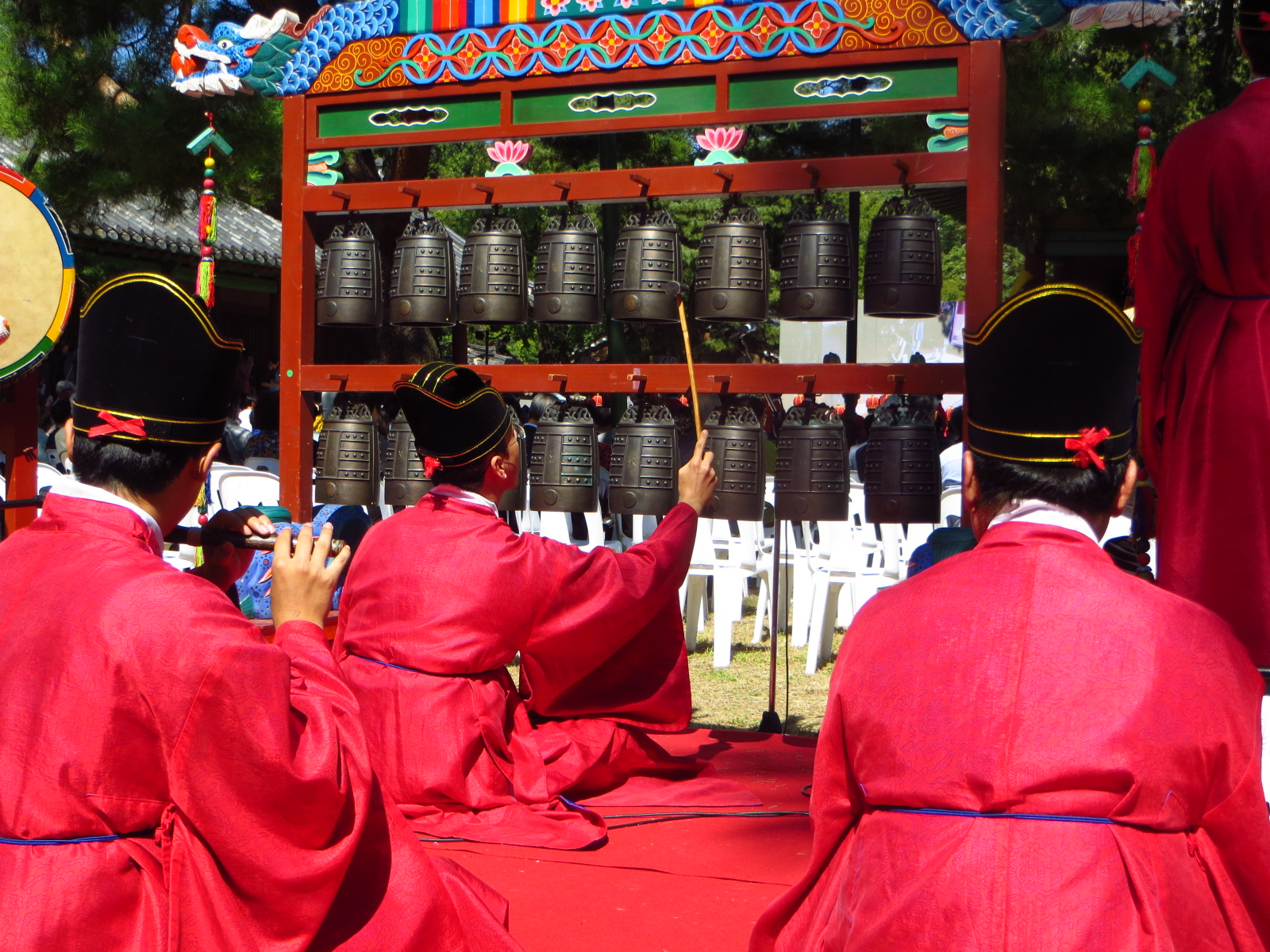
Musician playing Pyeonjong

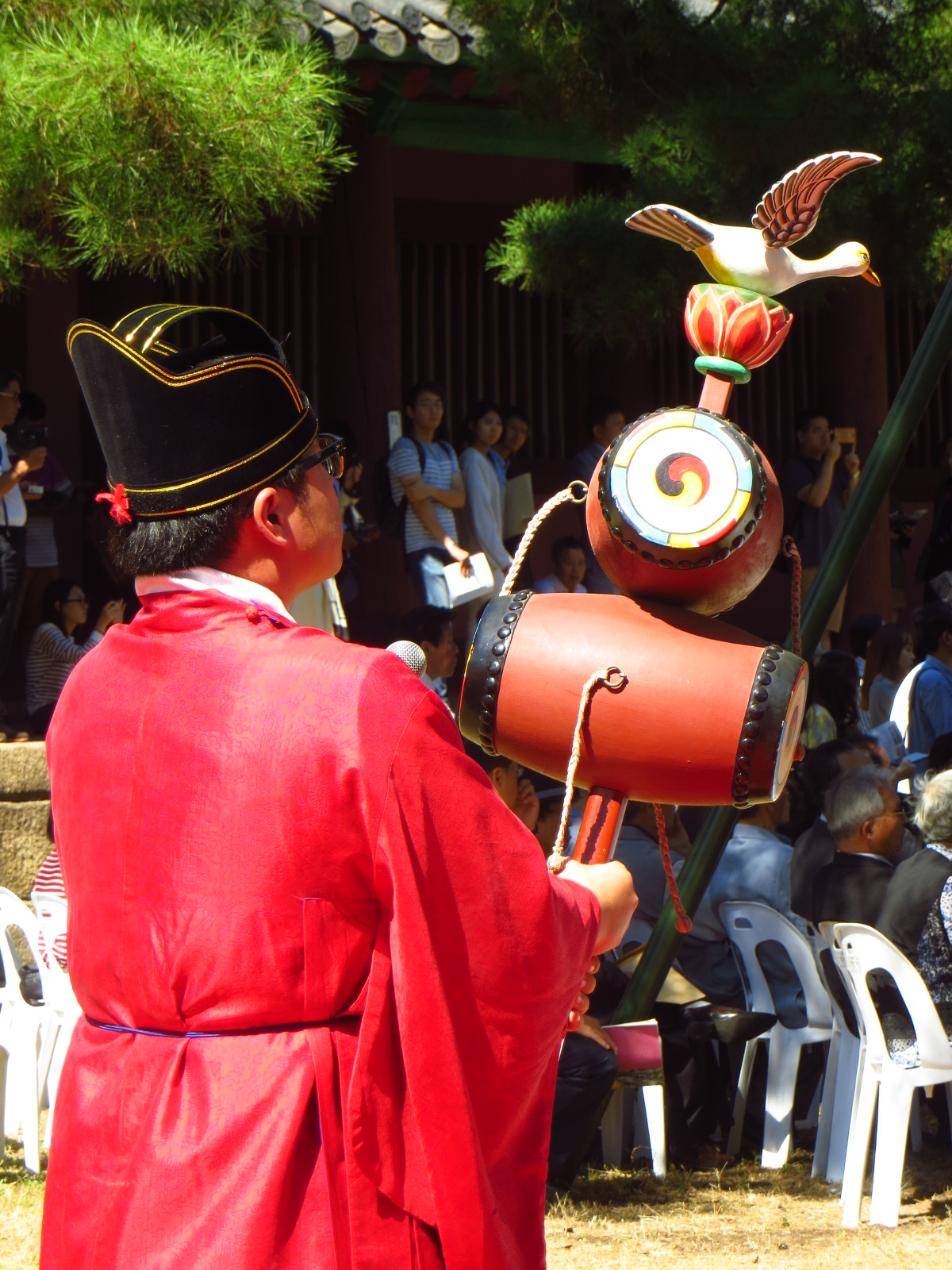
Musician with Nodo drums

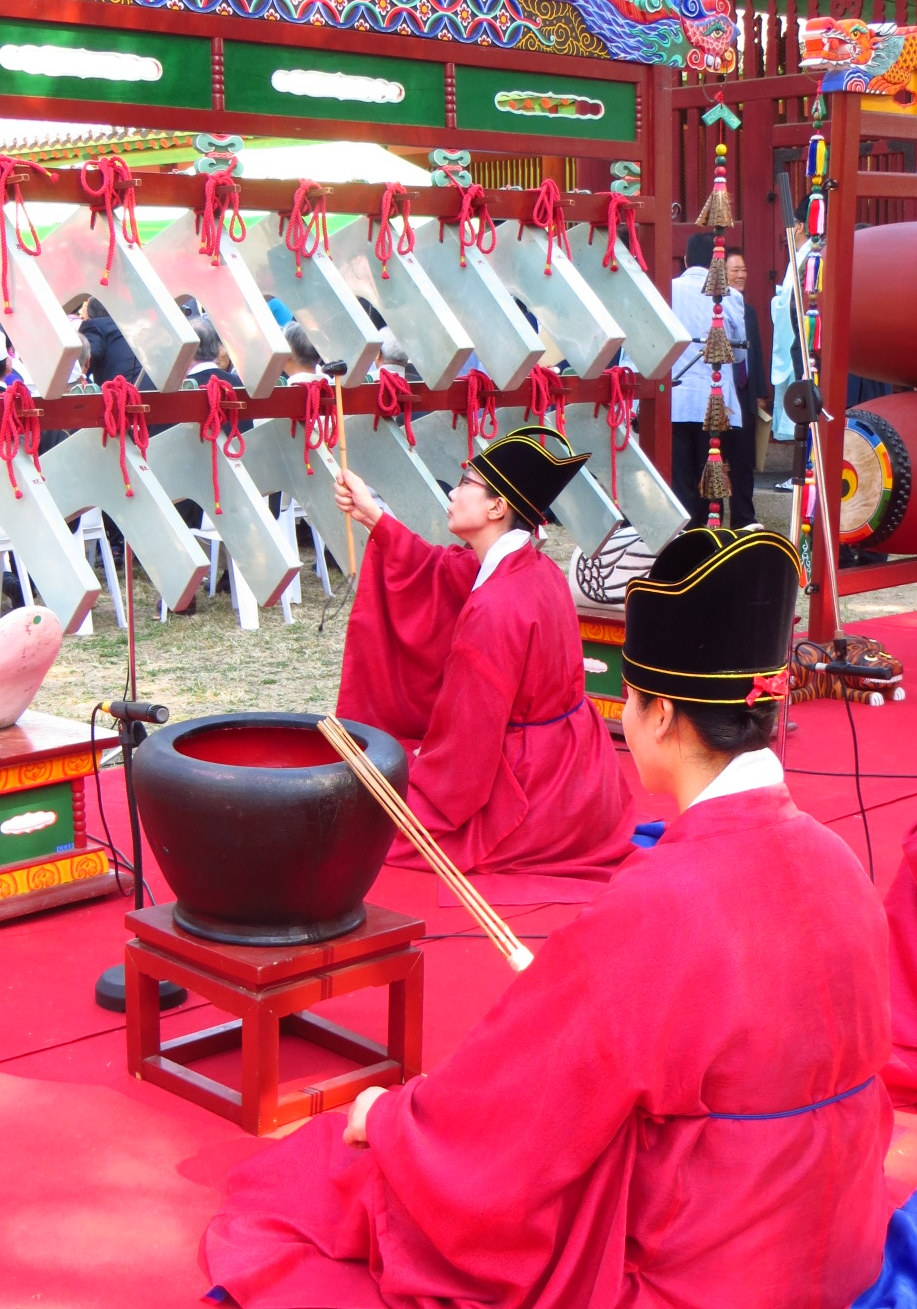
Bu, a clay pot percussion instrument, and pyeongyeong in the background

To match the 64 dancers, there are 64 musicians playing a variety of percussion and woodwind instruments in a performance of munmyo jeryeak. The music is a type of Aak, punctuated by flat notes by striking a bell, which are maintained for several seconds before raising sharply at the end with the help of wood flutes.

- Pyeongyeong (편경): an array of stone chimes
- Pyeonjong (편종): an array of bells
- Teukgyeong (특경): a single stone chime
- Teukjong (특종): a single bell
- Nogo (노고): a drum on a stand
- Nodo (노도): a smaller version of the nogo
- Eo (어): a statue of a tiger with a spiky spine, played by scraping a bamboo stick along the spine to create a ratcheting sound
- Seoul (슬): a stringed zither
- Geum (금): a stringed zither
- Hun (): a flute
- So (소): a flute
- Chuk (축): a wooden box

== Honored sages ==
The Seokjeon Daeje honors 39 historical figures of East Asia.

The Five Sages include Confucius and his four disciples:

- Yan Hui (顔子, 안자, Anja) – (兗國復聖公, 연국복성공)
- Zengzi (曾子, 증자, Chŭngja) – (郕國宗聖公, 성국종성공)
- Zisi (子思子, 자사자, Chasa Ja) – (沂國述聖公, 기국설성공)
- Mencius (孟子, 맹자, Maengja) – (鄒國亞聖公, 추국아성공)

Ten of the disciples of Confucius are also memorialized.

- Min Sun (閔損, 민손, Min Son) – (費公, 비공)
- Ran Geng (冉耕, 염경, Yŏm Kyŏng) – (鄆公, 운공)
- Ran Yong (冉雍, 염옹, Yŏm Ong) – (薛公, 설공)
- Zai Yu (宰予, 재여, Chae Yŏ) – (齊公, 제공)
- Duanmu Ci (端木賜, 단목사, Tanmok Sa) – (黎公, 여공)
- Ran Qiu (冉求, 염구, Yŏm Gu) – (徐公, 서공)
- Zhong You (仲由, 중유, Chung Yu) – (衛公, 위공)
- Yan Yan (言偃, 언언, Ŏn Ŏn) – (吳公, 오공)
- Bu Shang (卜商, 복상, Pok Sang) – (魏公, 위공)
- Zhuansun Shi (顓孫師, 단손사, Tanson Sa) – (陳公, 진공)

There are also 24 Men of Virtue, six from the Song Dynasty and 18 from Korea. The six Men of Virtue from Song are:

- Zhou Dunyi (周敦頤, 주돈이, Chu Toni, 1017–1073) – (道國公, 도국공)
- Cheng Hao (程顥, 정호, Chŏng Ho, 1032–1085) – (豫國公, 예국공)
- Cheng Yi (程頤, 정이, Chŏng I, 1033–1107) – (洛國公, 낙국공)
- Shao Yong (邵雍, 소옹, So Ong, 1011–1077) – (新安伯, 신안백)
- Zhang Zai (張載, 장재, Chang Chae, 1020–1077) – (郿伯, 미백)
- Zhu Xi (朱熹, 주희, Chu Hŭi, 1130–1200) – (徽國公, 휘국공)

The 18 Men of Virtue from Korea are:

- Seol Chong (薛聰, 설총, 650–730) – (弘儒侯, 홍유후)
- Ch'oe Ch'iwŏn (崔致遠, 최치원, 857-?) – (文昌侯, 문창후)
- An Hyang (安裕, 안유, 1243–1306) – (文成公, 문성공)
- Chŏng Mong-ju (鄭夢周, 정몽주, 1337–1392) – (文忠公, 문충공)
- Kim Koengp'il (金宏弼, 김굉필, 1454–1504) – (文敬公, 문경공)
- Chŏng Yŏch'ang (鄭汝昌, 정여창, 1450–1504) – (文憲公, 문헌공)
- Cho Kwangjo (趙光祖, 조광조, 1482–1520) – (文正公, 문정공)
- Yi Ŏnjŏk (李彦迪, 이언적, 1491–1553) – (文元公, 문언공)
- Yi Hwang (李滉, 이황, 1501–1570) – (文純公, 문순공)
- Kim Inhu (金麟厚, 김인후, 1510–1560) – (文正公, 문정공)
- Yi I (李珥, 이이, 1537–1584) – (文成公, 문성공)
- Sŏng Hon (成渾, 성혼, 1535–1598) – (文簡公, 문간공)
- Kim Jang-saeng (金長生, 김장생, 1548–1631) – (文元公, 문원공)
- Cho Hŏn (趙憲, 조헌, 1544–1592) – (文烈公, 문열공)
- Kim Jip (金集, 김집, 1574–1656) – (文敬公, 문경공)
- Song Si-yŏl (宋時烈, 송시열, 1607–1689) – (文正公, 문정공)
- Song Chun-gil (宋浚吉, 송준길, 1606–1672) – (文正公, 문정공)
- Pak Sech'ae (朴世采, 박세채, 1631–1695) – (文純公, 문순공)

== Images ==
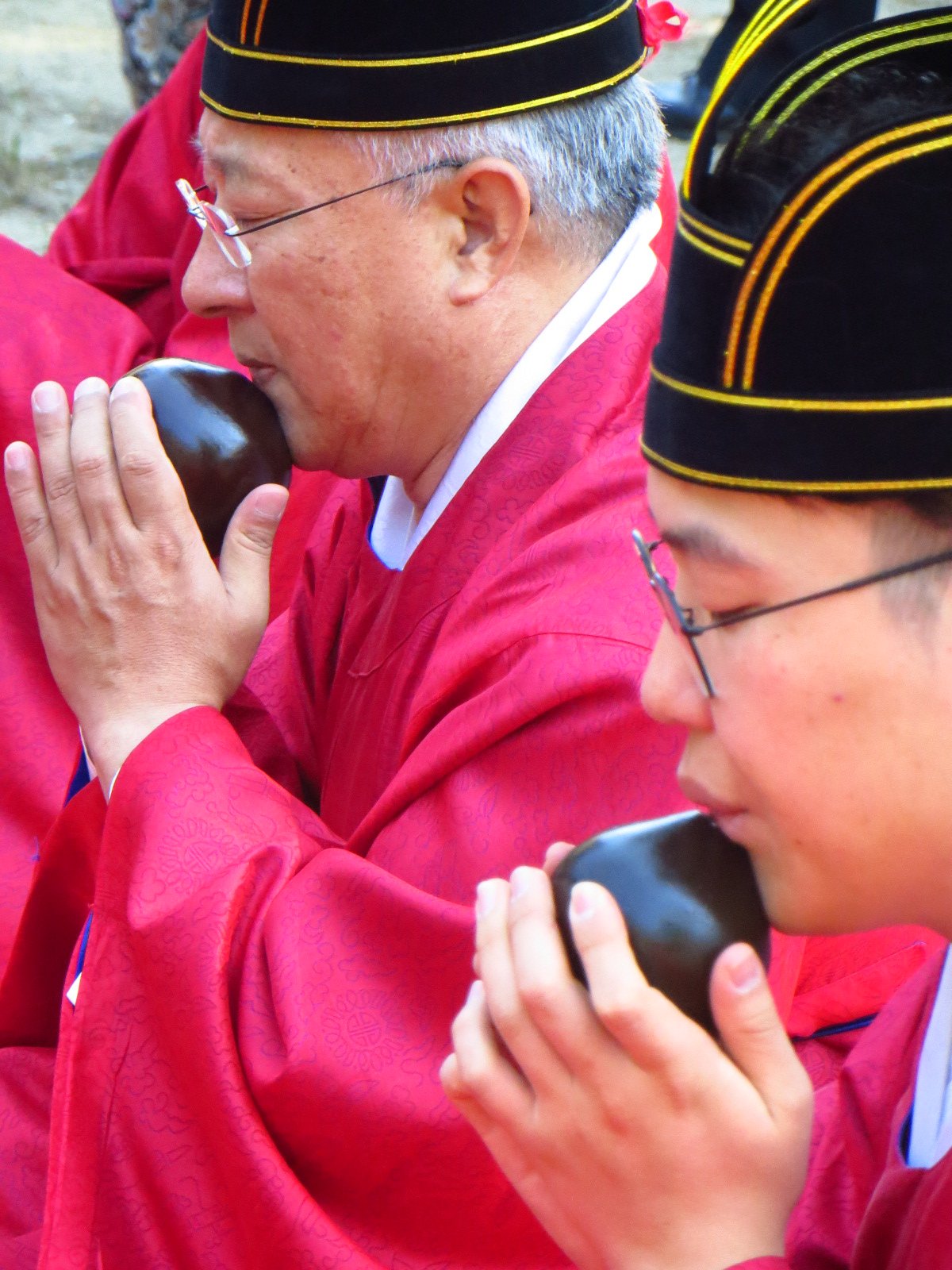
Musicians at a Seokjeon Daeje ceremony at Munmyo Shrine playing Hun

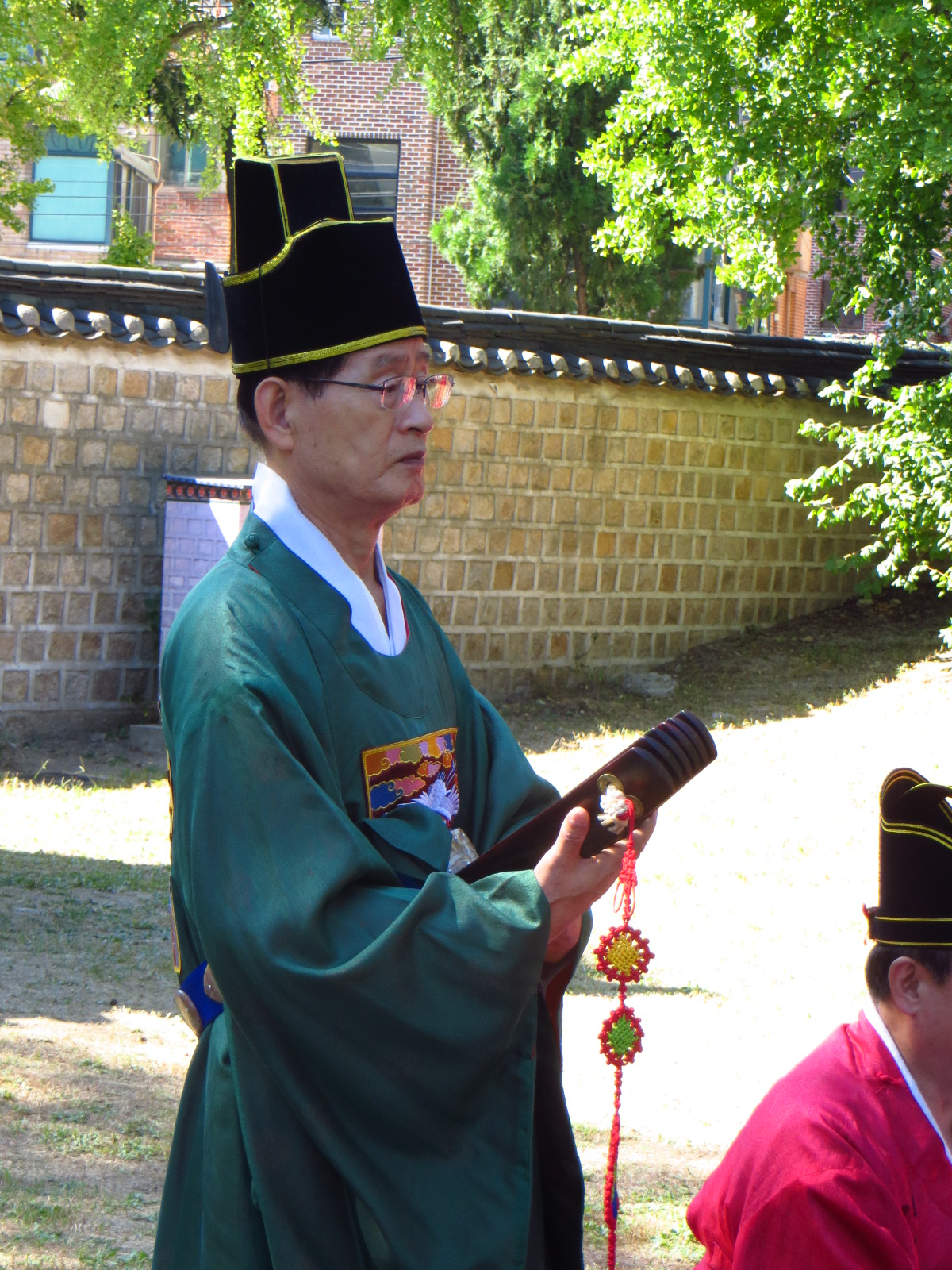
Musician with a bak

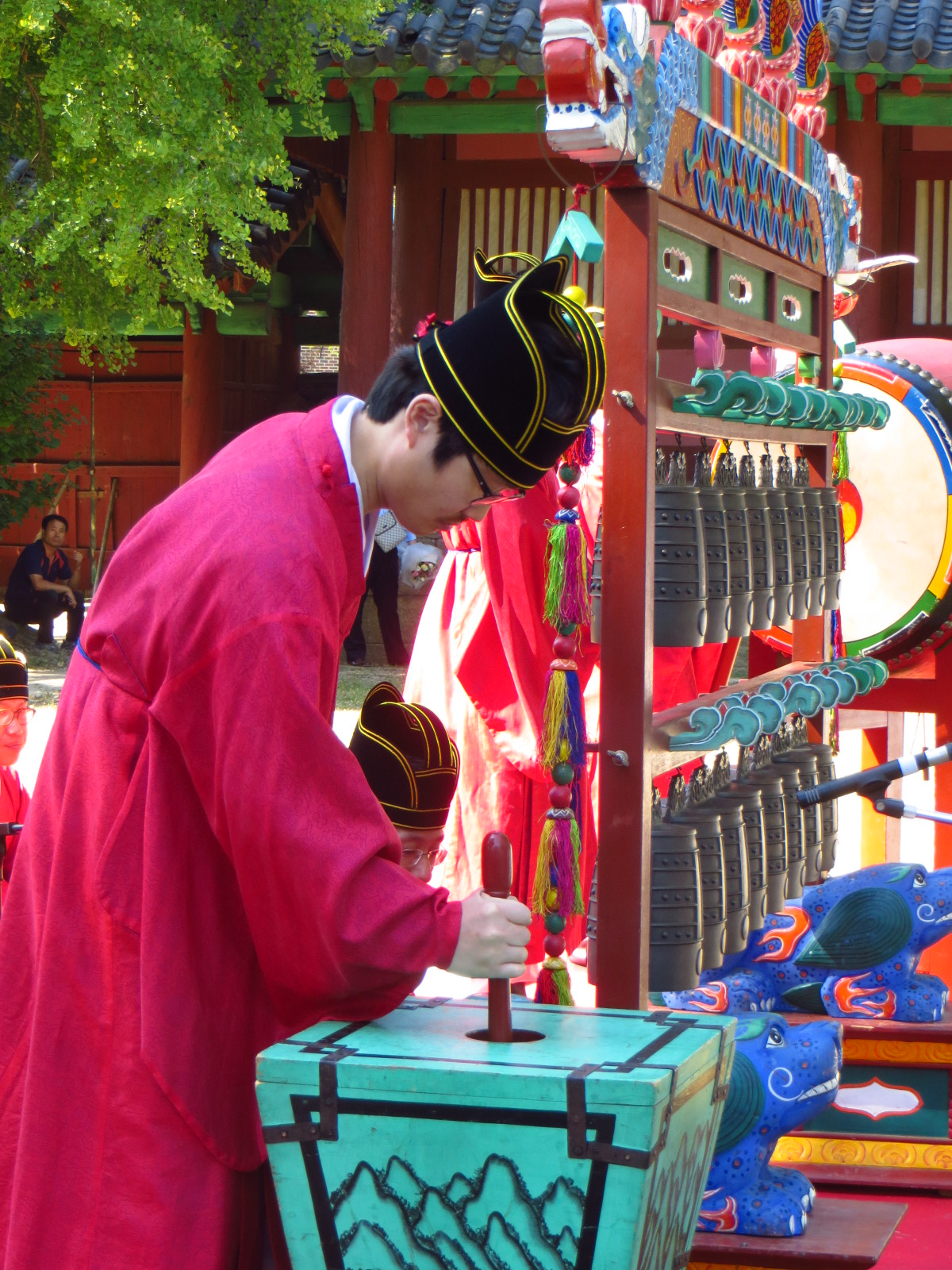
Musician playing a Chuk

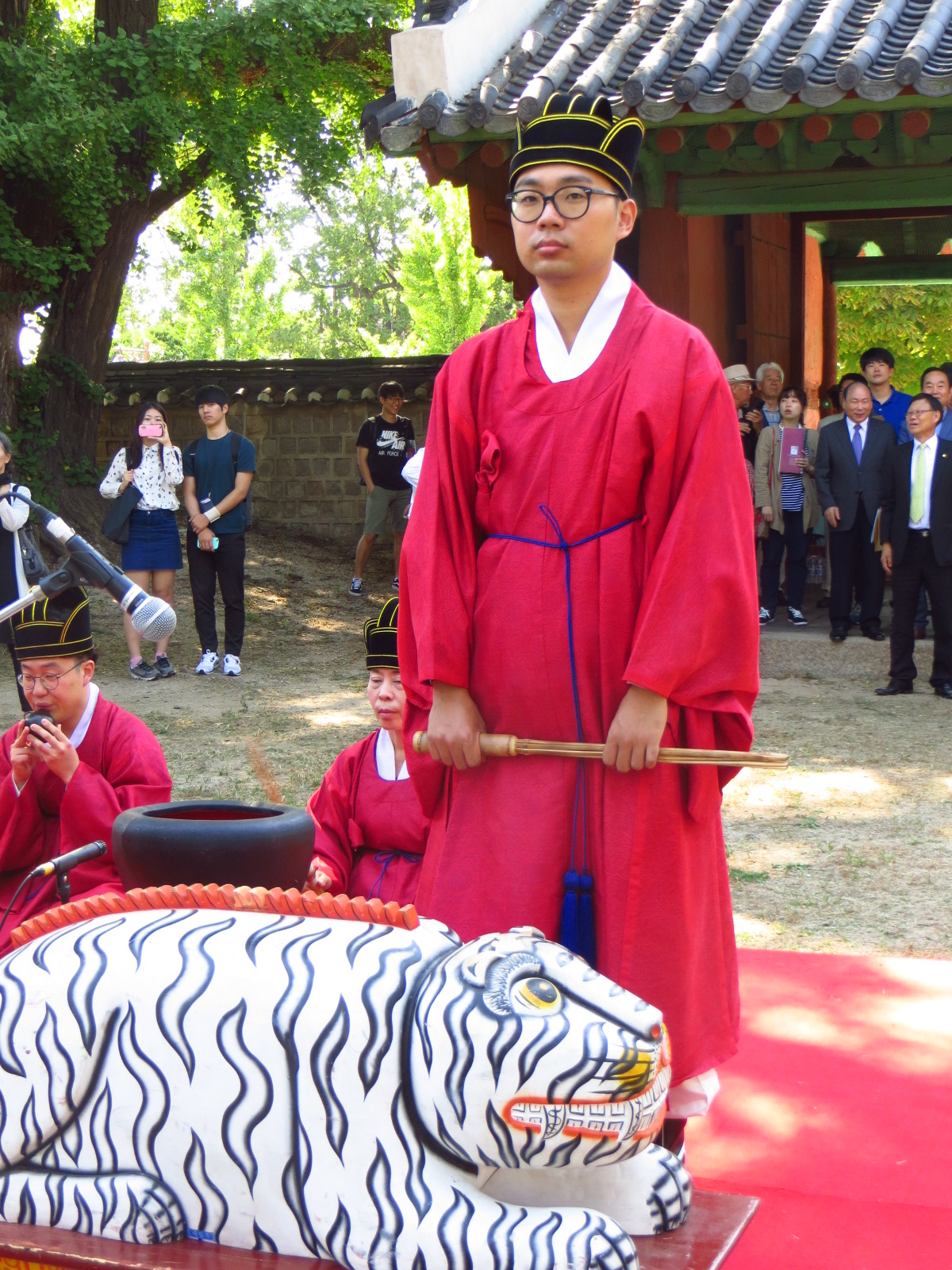
Eo, a percussion instrument

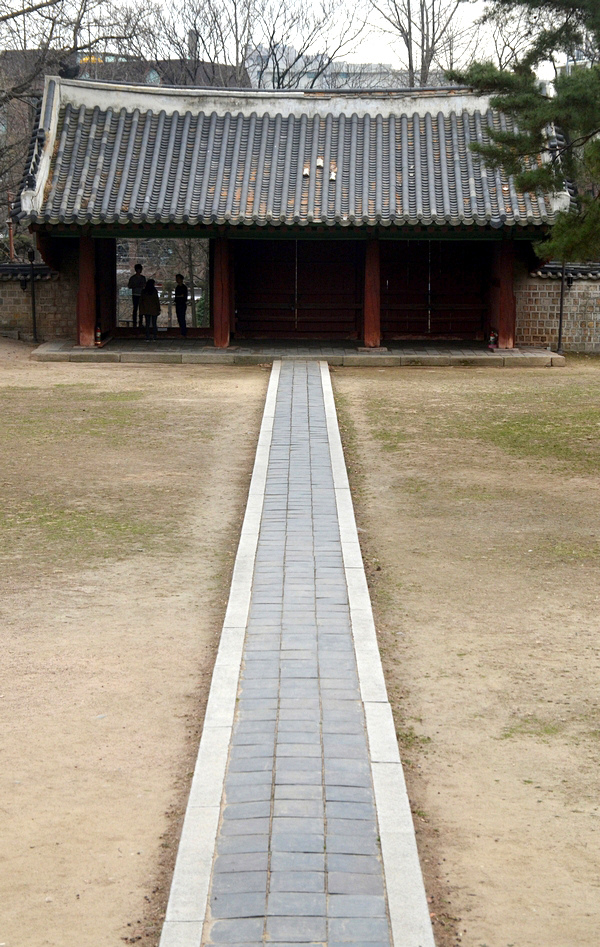
Sinsammun is opened for Seokjeon ceremonies, allowing spirits to enter and follow the spirit path Yeongshin to the temple.

== See also ==
- Education in the Joseon Dynasty
- Aak
- Gukjagam
- Songgyungwan at Kaesong
- Sungkyunkwan University
- Sungkyunkwan
