= Korean drum =

Family of percussion instruments

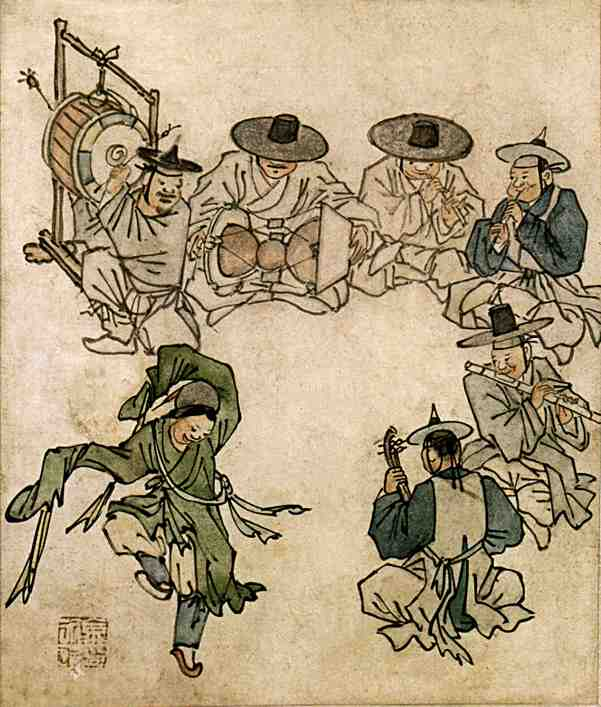
In the picture titled "Dancing boy" (무동:舞童), several types of Korean drums are depicted.

Korean drums play an important part in traditional Korean music, ranging from folk music to royal court music. There are a wide variety of shapes and sizes, for use both in accompanying other instruments and in special drumming performances.

In the traditional Korean classification of instruments, drums are grouped with the hyeokbu (혁부, 革部), or instruments made with leather. A notable class of these leather drums are Korean barrel drums.

== History ==
During the Joseon period, many types of drums were used for the royal court music, including the janggu, jwago, yonggo, gyobanggo, jingo, jeolgo, nogo, and others. Among these, the janggu was also used for folk music, and later became the most commonly used drum in Korean music.

== Types ==
- Buk (북) - Double-headed shallow barrel drum used in folk music and played with one stick or one hand and one stick; varieties of buk are used in pansori, pungmul, and samulnori
- Janggu or Janggo (장고 or 장구; 杖鼓 or 長鼓) - A double-headed hourglass-shaped drum generally played with one stick and one hand
- Galgo (갈고; 羯鼓) - Double-headed hourglass-shaped drum similar to the janggo but played with two sticks and thinner drum heads; sometimes called yanggo or yangjanggo; no longer commonly used
- Jingo (진고; 晉鼓) - Largest barrel drum
- Jeolgo (절고; 節鼓) - Barrel drum
- Jwago (좌고; 座鼓) - A barrel drum in a wooden frame
- Geongo (건고; 建鼓) - Huge barrel drum
- Yonggo (용고; 龍鼓) - A barrel drum with a dragon painted on its shell; used in daechwita
- Eunggo (응고; 應鼓) - Barrel drum suspended from a frame
- Sakgo - (삭고; 朔鼓) - A long barrel drum suspended from a wooden frame
- Gyobanggo (교방고; 敎坊鼓) - Flat drum suspended from a frame
- Junggo (중고; 中鼓) - Flat drum suspended from a frame; similar to the gyobanggo but larger
- Sogo (소고; 小鼓) - A small hand-held drum
- Nogo (노고; 路鼓) - A set of two drums pierced by a pole
- Nodo (노도; 路鼗) - A set of two small drums on a pole, which is twisted to play; used in ritual music
- Yeongdo (노도; hanja:靈鼗) - Four drums on a pole, which is twisted to play; used in ritual music
- Noedo (뇌도; 雷鼗)) - six small drums hung in a frame; used in ritual music
- Noego (뇌고; 雷鼓) - Three small barrel drums on a pole, which is twisted to play; used in ritual music
- Do (도) - single pellet drum on a pole

== Gallery ==
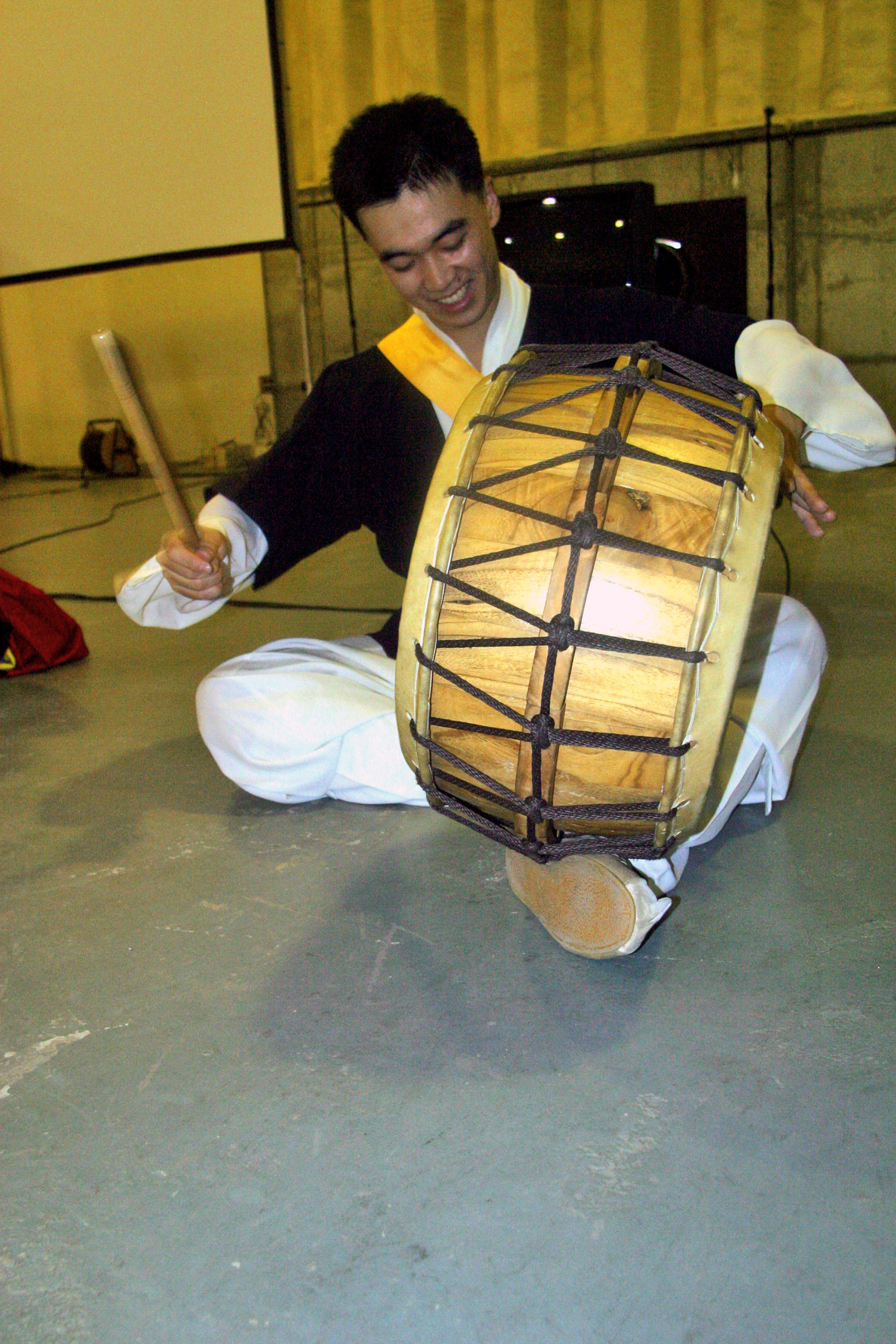
A South Korean airman playing a pungmul-buk

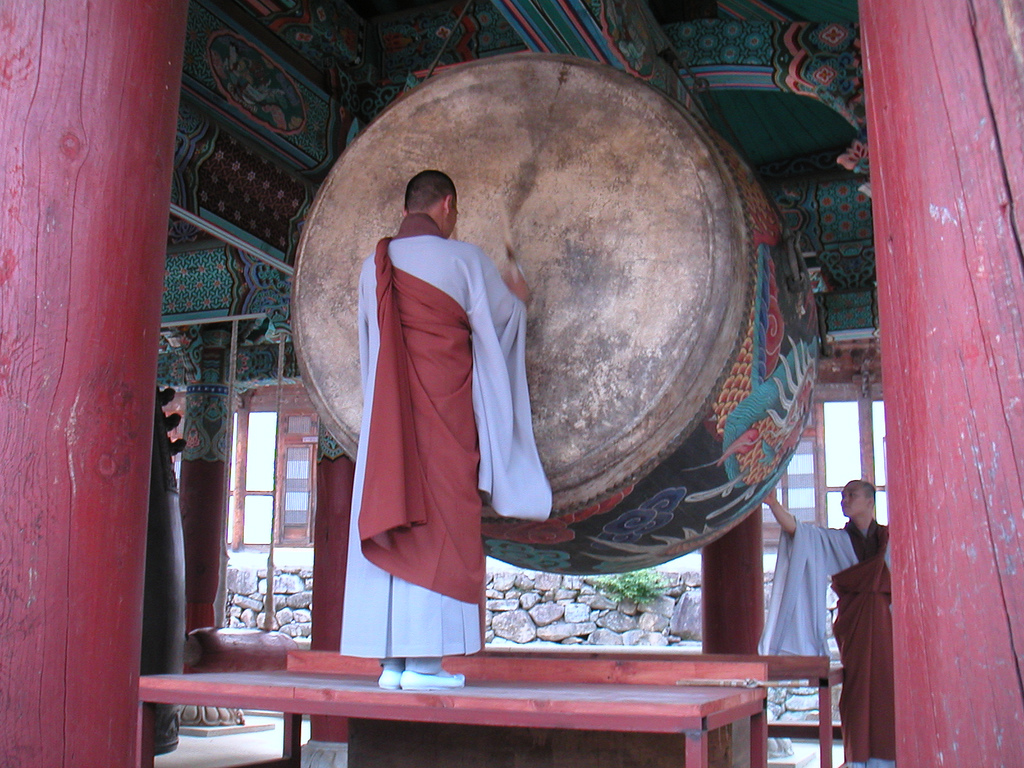
Beopgo

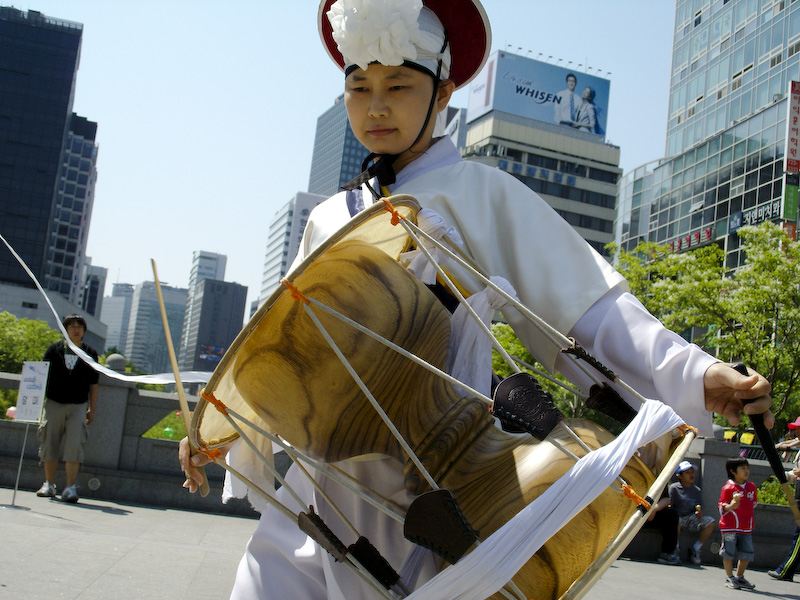
Janggu

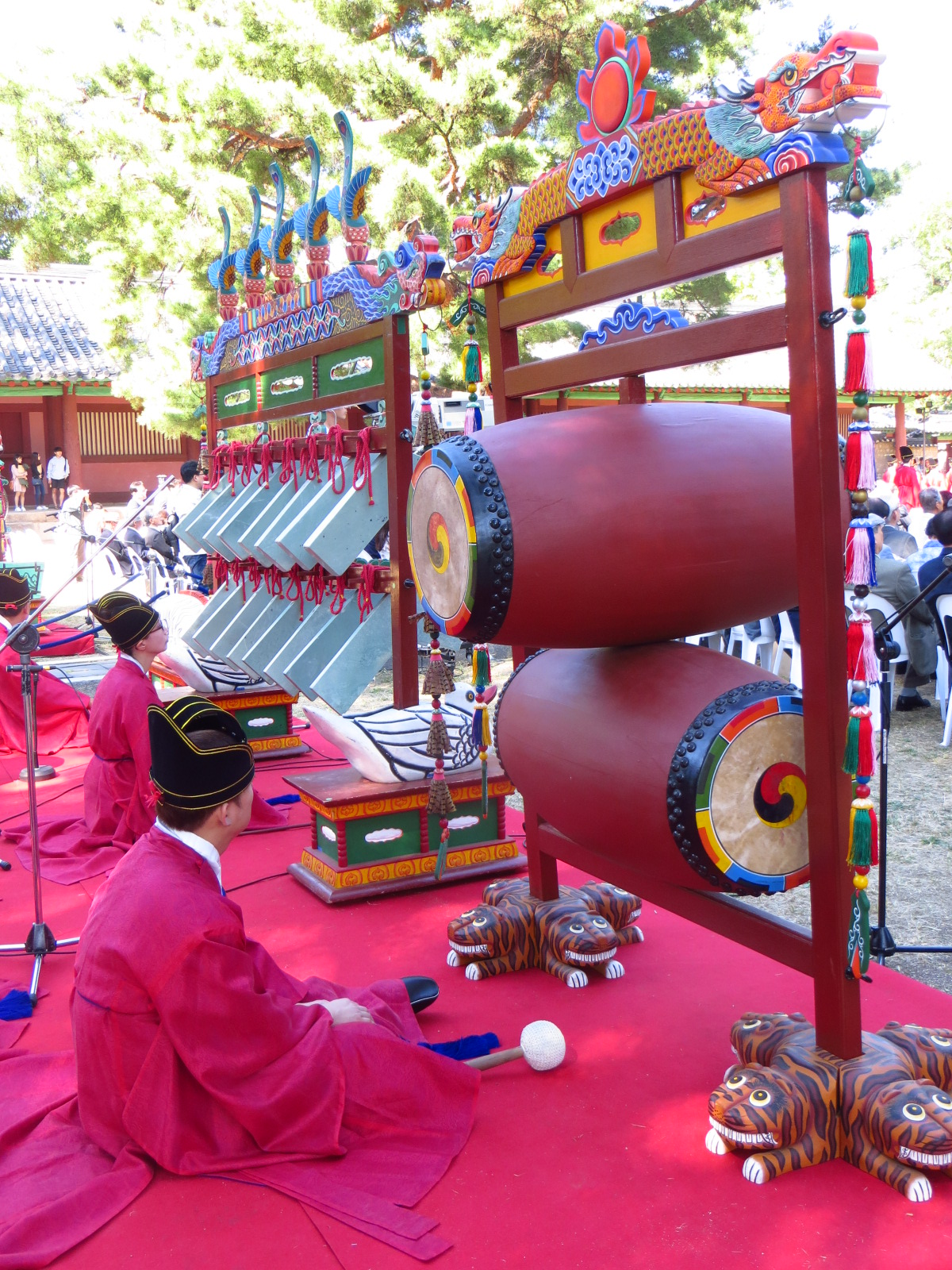
Nogo

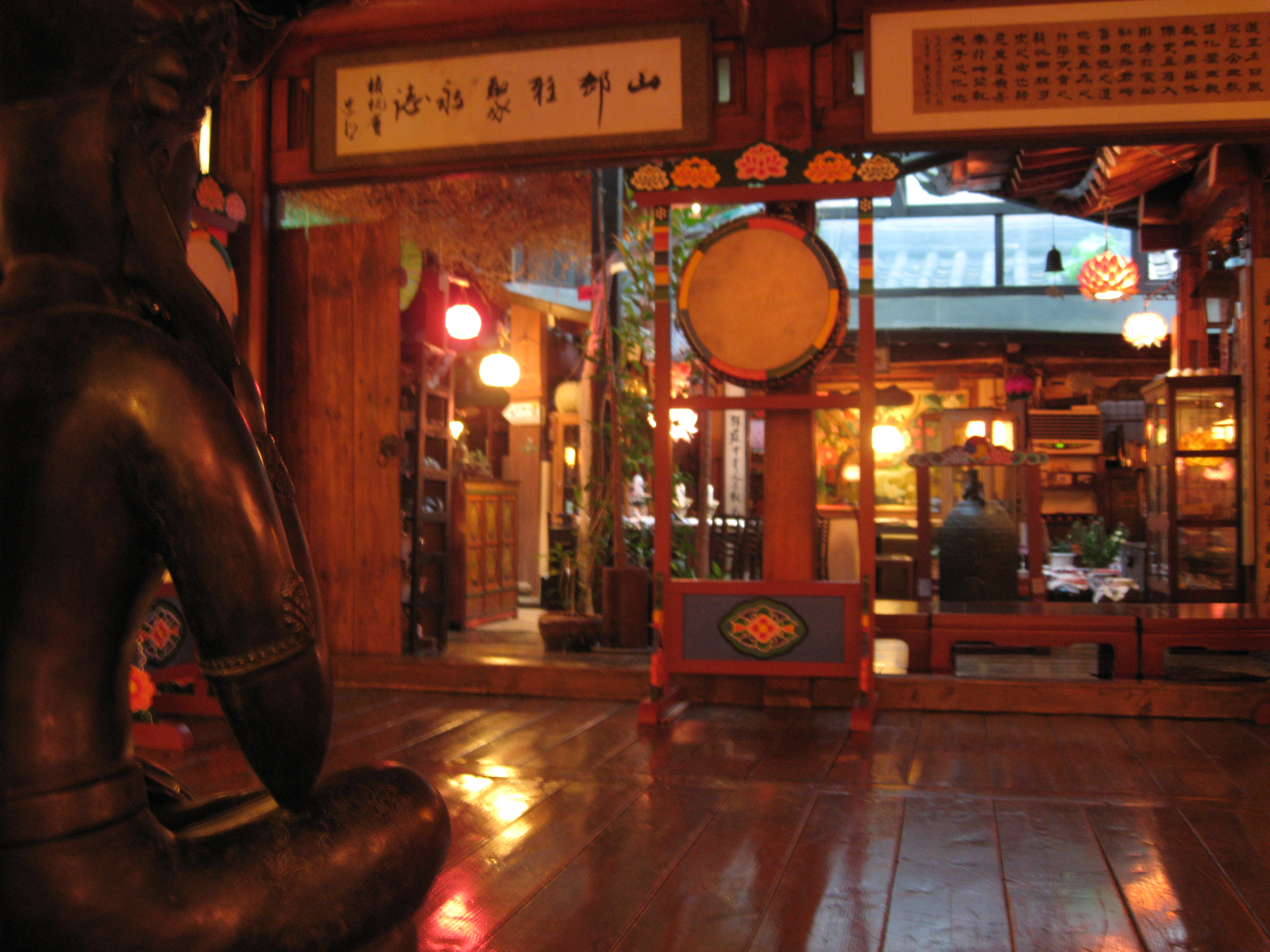

== See also ==
- Traditional Korean musical instruments

== Bibliography ==
- Samguk Sagi
- Goryeosa
- Book of Sui
- Akhak Gwebeom
