= Buk (drum) =

Korean traditional drum

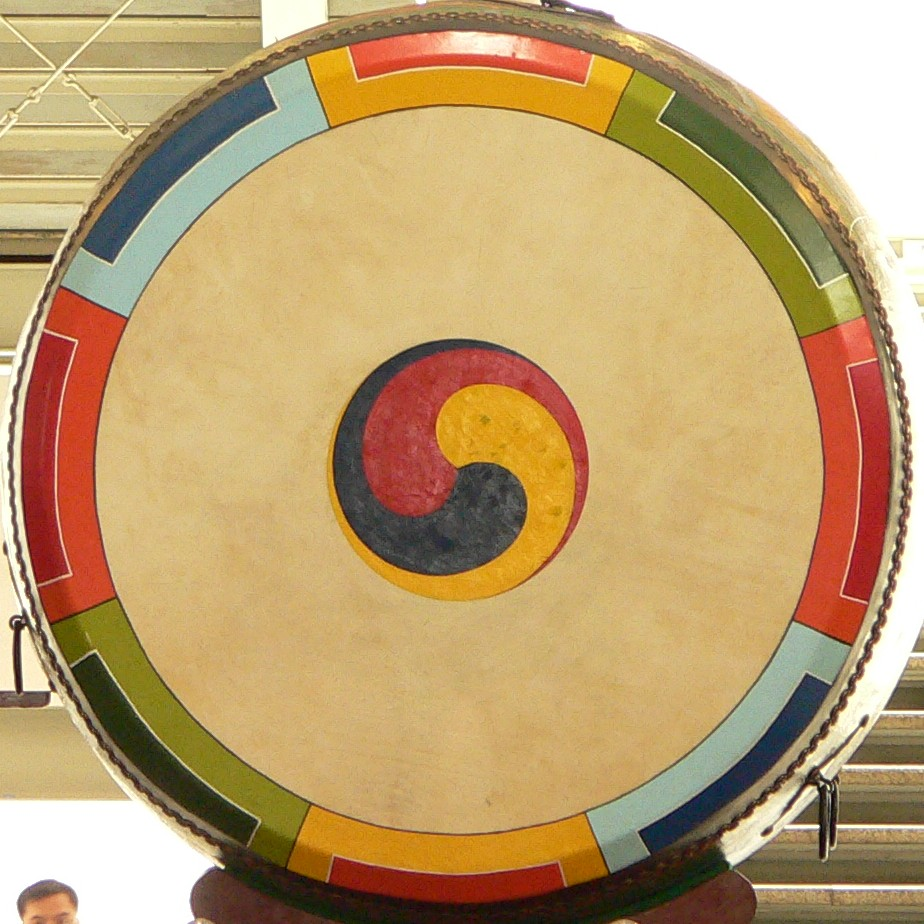
- A traditional buk drum on its side

Percussion instrument
- Classification: Drum

Sound sample
- Imsil Pilbong nongak played on the buk (whee-mori)

- Buk
- Hangul: 북
- RR: buk
- MR: puk

The buk (Korean: 북) is a traditional Korean drum. While the term buk is a native Korean word used as a generic term meaning "drum" (the Sino-Korean word being go), it is most often used to refer to a shallow barrel-shaped drum, with a round wooden body that is covered on both ends with animal skin. Buk are categorized as hyeokbu (혁부, 革部) which are instruments made with leather, and has been used for jeongak (Korean court music) and folk music.

== History ==
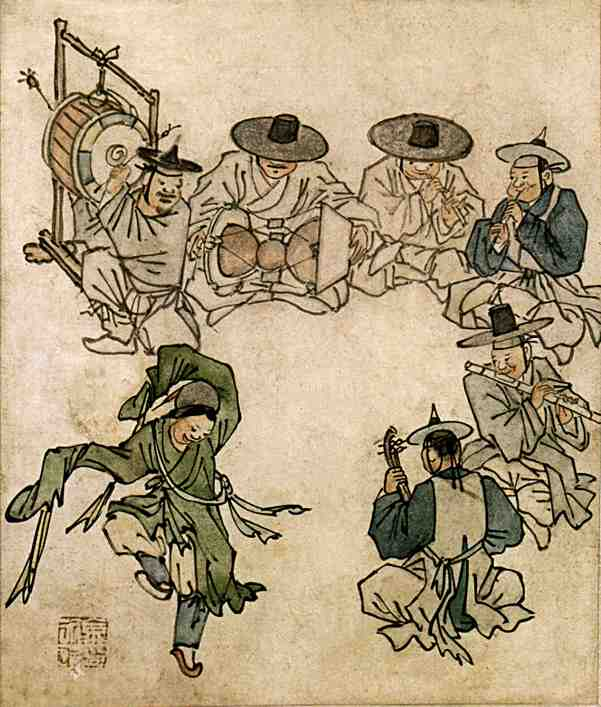
In the picture titled "Dancing boy" (무동:舞童), samhyeon yukgak including a buk and janggu are depicted.

The buk used for court music are usually fixed with nails on the rims, while ones used for folk music are usually tied up with leather straps to form the shape. Performers in the court music usually beat their buk with bukchae (북채, a drum stick) on one hand or two hands together, while drummers in the folk music commonly beat their buk with it on their right hand as hitting the other side of the buk with their bare left hand. A while ago, even jong (종, bell) was referred to as "soebuk" (쇠북, metal drum) and included in the buk category.

Buk have been used for Korean music since the period of the Three Kingdoms of Korea (57 BC – 668 AD) in light of mural paintings in Anak Tomb of Goguryeo (37 BC – 668 AD) and records of Book of Sui on the kingdoms, Goguryeo and Baekje (18 BC – 660 AD). In the 3rd of Anak Tomb, two types of buk are depicted in the paintings titled Juakdo (주악도, 奏樂圖, "painting of playing music") and Haengryeoldo (행렬도, 行列圖, "painting of marching") such as ipgo (입고, 立鼓) and damgo (담고, 擔鼓) respectively. The ipgo is a buk that performers beat as standing, while the damgo is a buk that drummers strike as carrying it on their shoulder.

During the Unified Silla period (668–935), daego (대고, 大鼓) or keunbuk, meaning "a big drum", was used along with a percussion instrument named bak (박, 拍) in a music played by Samhyeon samjuk (삼현삼죽, 三絃三竹) which comprises samhyeon, three string instruments such as geomungo, gayageum, and hyangbipa and samjuk such as daegeum, junggeumand sogeum. In the Goryeo period (918–1392), as dangak and aak were introduced to Korea from China, a lot of buk such as janggu, gyobanggo, jingo began to be used for the court music.

In the Joseon period, scores of buk were used for the royal court music including janggu, jwago, yonggo, gyobanggo, jingo, jeolgo, nogo and others. Among them janggu was also used for folk music, and later became the most commonly used instrument.

While there are twenty types of buk used in the present Korean traditional music, most commonly used buk are jwago to perform Samhyeon yukgak (삼현육각, 三絃六角), yonggo for marching music, gyobango for bukchum (북춤, drum dance), beopgo for Buddhist ritual ceremonies, sogo used by Namsadang, and street musicians, soribuk or called gojangbuk for pansori, maegubuk (or called nongakbuk) used for nongak, and motbanggo used by farmers as working.

== Usages ==
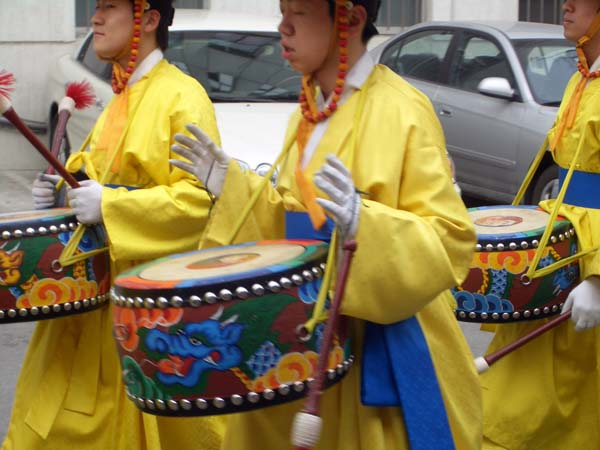
Yonggo being played in a marching daechwita ensemble

There are two forms of undecorated buk used in Korean folk music: the buk used to accompany pansori, which has tacked heads, is called a sori-buk (소리북), while the buk used to accompany pungmul music, which has laced heads, is called pungmul-buk (풍물북).^{photo} The sori-buk is played with both an open left hand and a stick made of birch that is held in the right hand, with the stick striking both the right drumhead and the wood of the drum's body. The pungmul-buk is one of the four instruments used in samul nori, a modern performance version of pungmul. It is played by striking a single stick (usually with the right hand) on only one of its heads.

Due to its similarity in shape and construction, the yonggo (hangul: 용고; hanja: 龍鼓; literally "dragon drum"), which is a barrel drum with tacked heads decorated with painted dragon designs and used in the military wind-and-percussion music called daechwita, is sometimes also classified as a form of buk. It is struck with two padded sticks.

A modern set of buk (usually four) is called modeum buk (모듬북).^{photo} They are typically placed horizontally on wooden stands and played with sticks.^{photo}

== Types ==
Imsil Pilbong nongak played on the buk (북)
doen-samchae (된삼채, to play the samchae fast)

Slow gaengigaeng (느린-갠지갱)

ilchae (일채)

leechae (이채)

samchae (삼채)

sachae (사채)

yukchae (육채)

chilchae (칠채)

- Janggu or Janggo (hangul: 장고 or 장구; hanja: 杖鼓 or 長鼓) – A double-headed hourglass-shaped drum played with one stick in each hand, or with one stick and one hand
- Galgo (hangul: 갈고; hanja: 羯鼓) – Double-headed hourglass-shaped drum similar to the janggo but played with two sticks and thinner drum heads; sometimes called yanggo or yangjanggo; no longer commonly used
- Jingo (hangul: 진고; hanja: 晉鼓) – Largest barrel drum
- Jeolgo (hangul: 절고; hanja: 節鼓) – Barrel drum
- Jwago (hangul: 좌고; hanja: 座鼓) – A barrel drum in a wooden frame
- Geongo (hangul: 건고; hanja: 建鼓) – Huge barrel drum
- Yonggo (hangul: 용고; hanja: 龍鼓) – A barrel drum with a dragon painted on its shell; used in daechwita
- Eunggo (hangul: 응고; hanja: 應鼓) – Barrel drum suspended from a frame
- Sakgo – (hangul: 삭고; hanja: 朔鼓) – A long barrel drum suspended from a wooden frame
- Gyobanggo (hangul: 교방고; hanja: 敎坊鼓) – Flat drum suspended from a frame
- Junggo (hangul: 중고; hanja: 中鼓) – Flat drum suspended from a frame; similar to the gyobanggo but larger
- Sogo (hangul: 소고; hanja: 小鼓) – A small hand-held drum
- Beopgo (hangul: 법고; hanja: 法鼓) – A small dharma drum; also refers to a large barrel drum
- Nogo (hangul: 노고; hanja: 路鼓) – A set of two drums pierced by a pole
- Nodo (hangul: 노도; hanja: 路鼗) – A set of two small drums on a pole, which is twisted to play; used in ritual music
- Yeongdo (hangul: 노도; hanja:靈鼗) – Four drums on a pole, which is twisted to play; used in ritual music
- Noedo (hangul: 뇌도; hanja: 雷鼗)) – six small drums hung in a frame; used in ritual music
- Noego (hangul: 뇌고; hanja: 雷鼓) – Three small barrel drums on a pole, which is twisted to play; used in ritual music
- Do (도) – single pellet drum on a pole

== Gallery ==
Buk

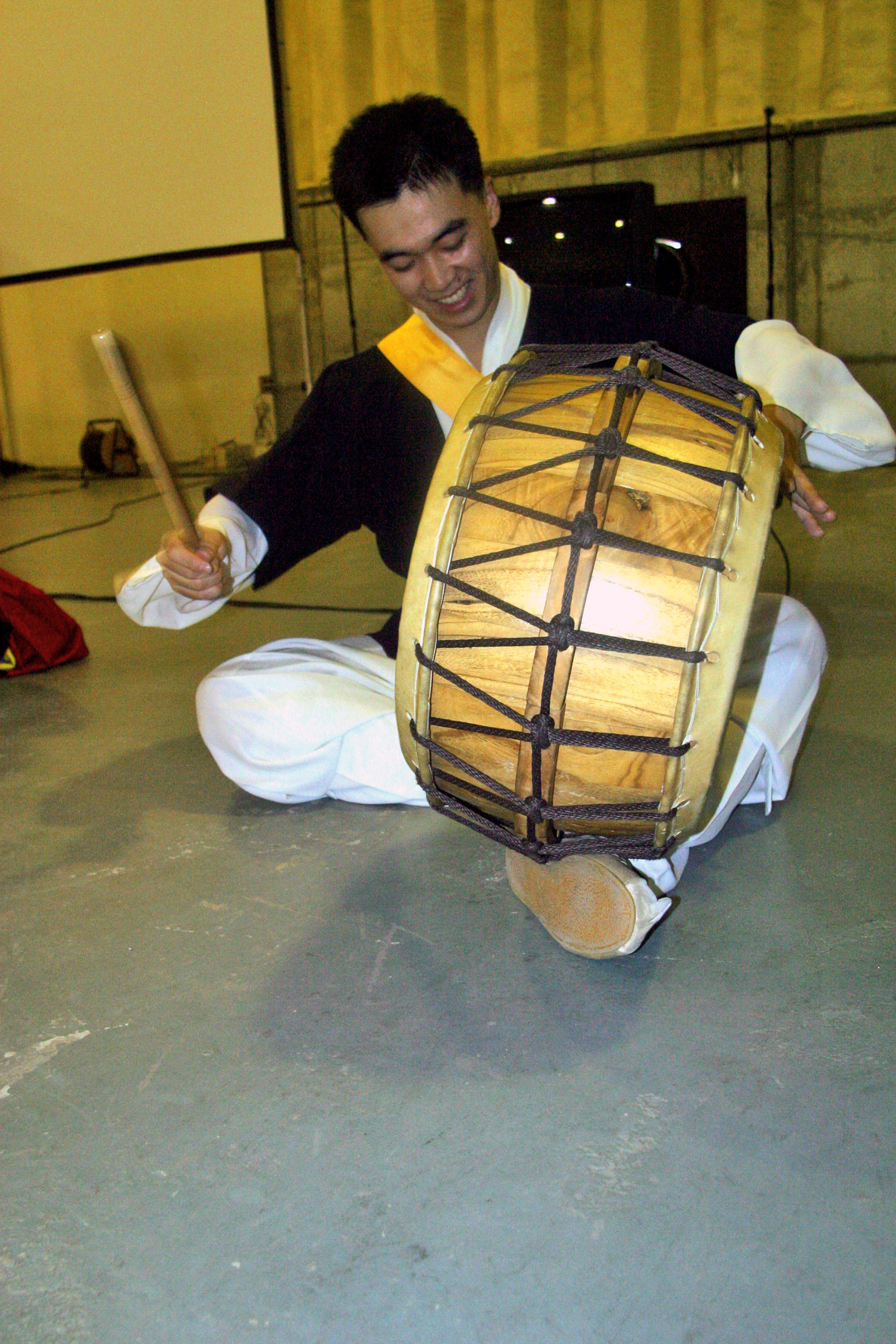
A South Korean airman playing a pungmul-buk

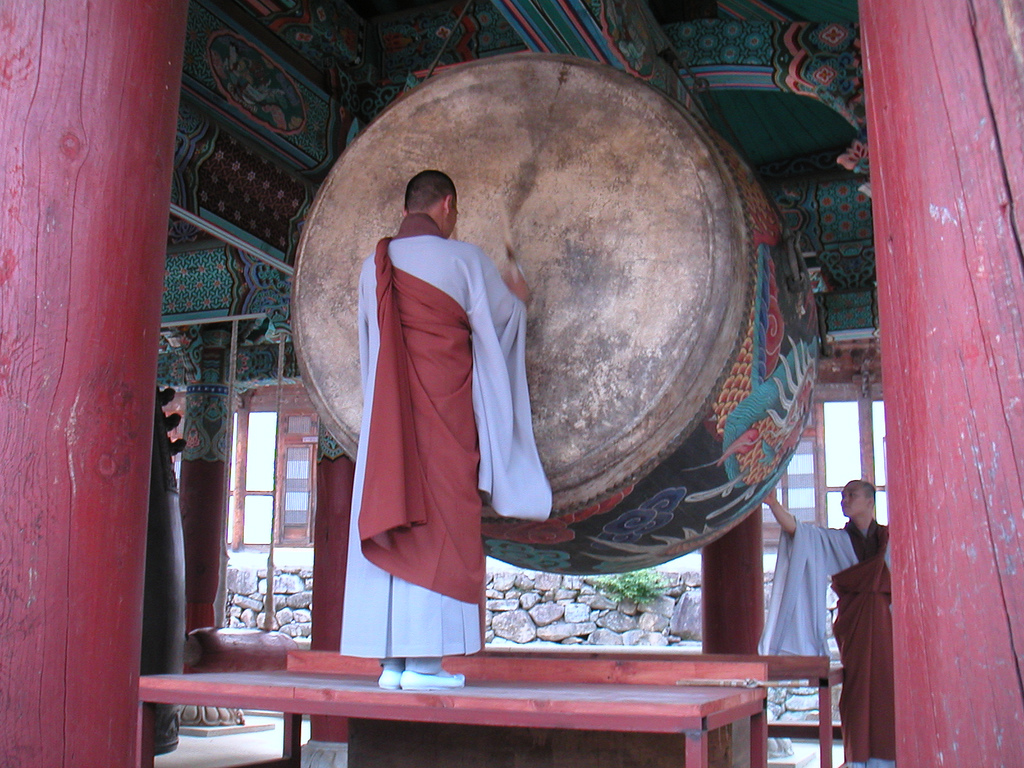
Beopgo

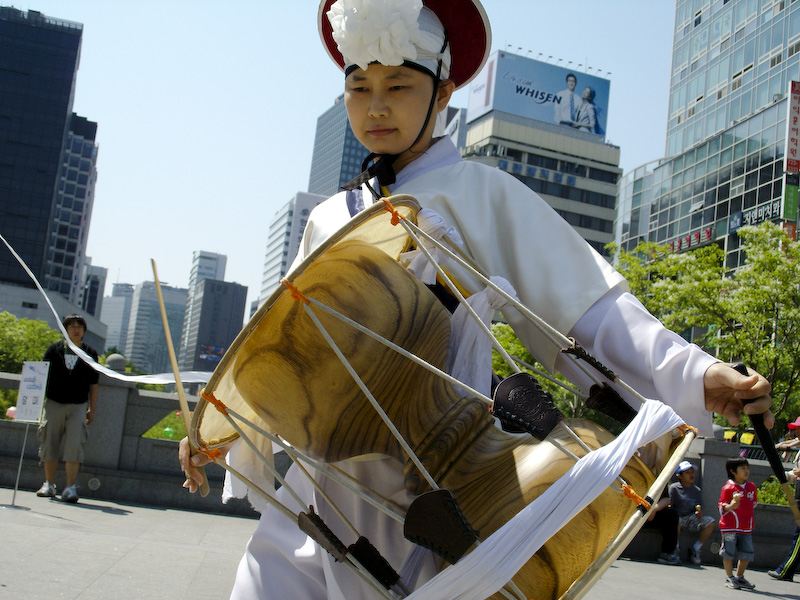
Janggu

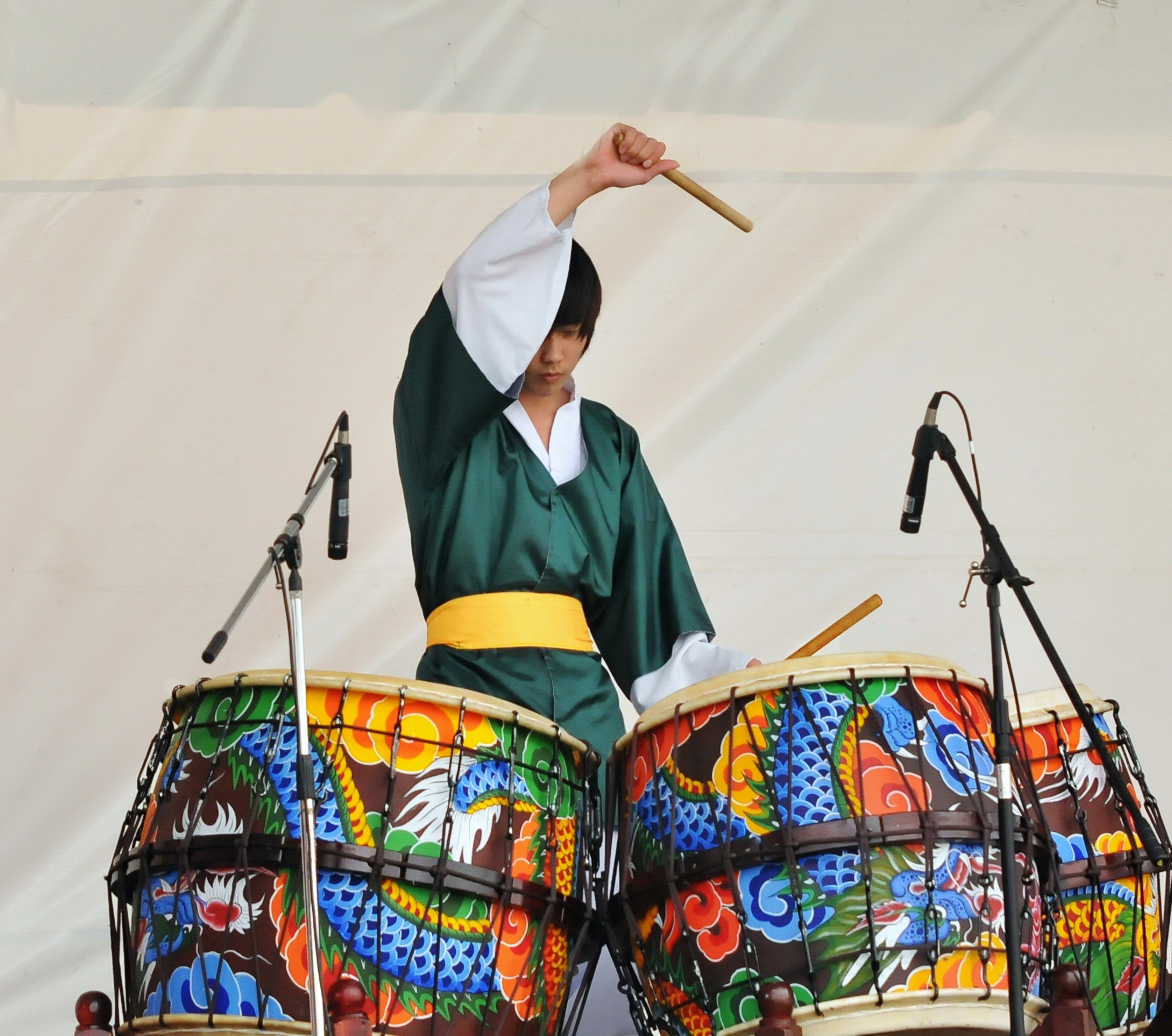
Drum performance

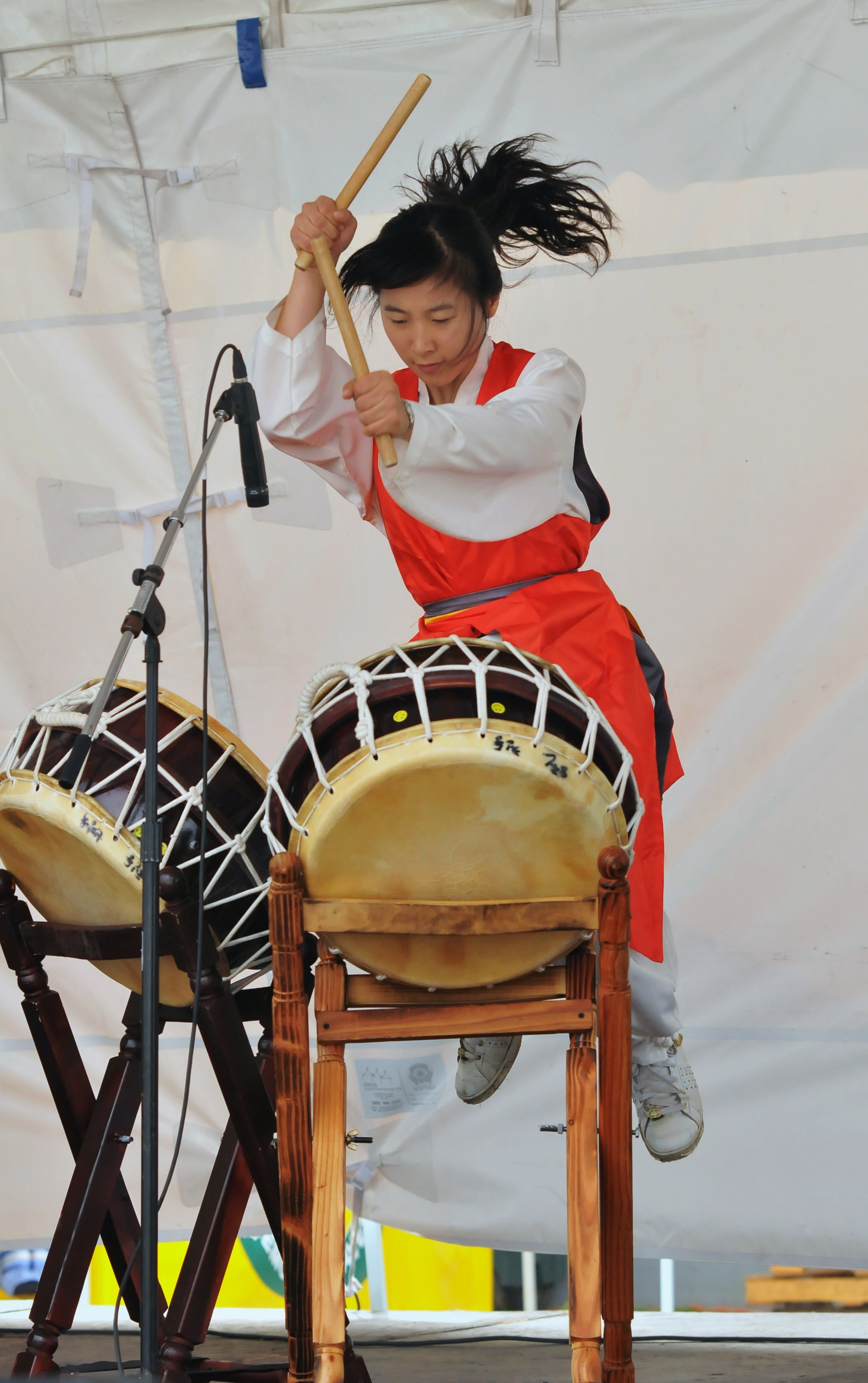
Korean drummer

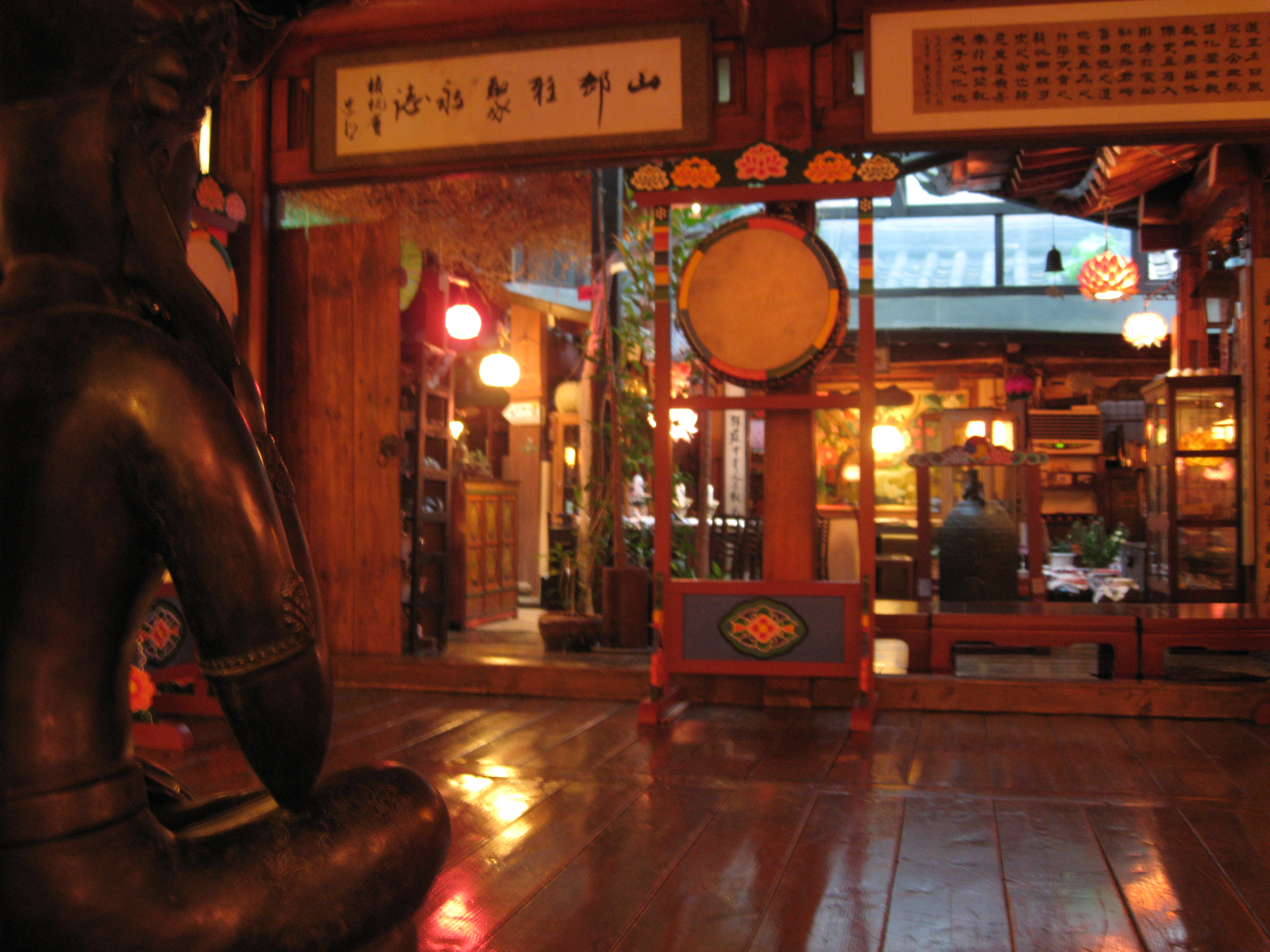

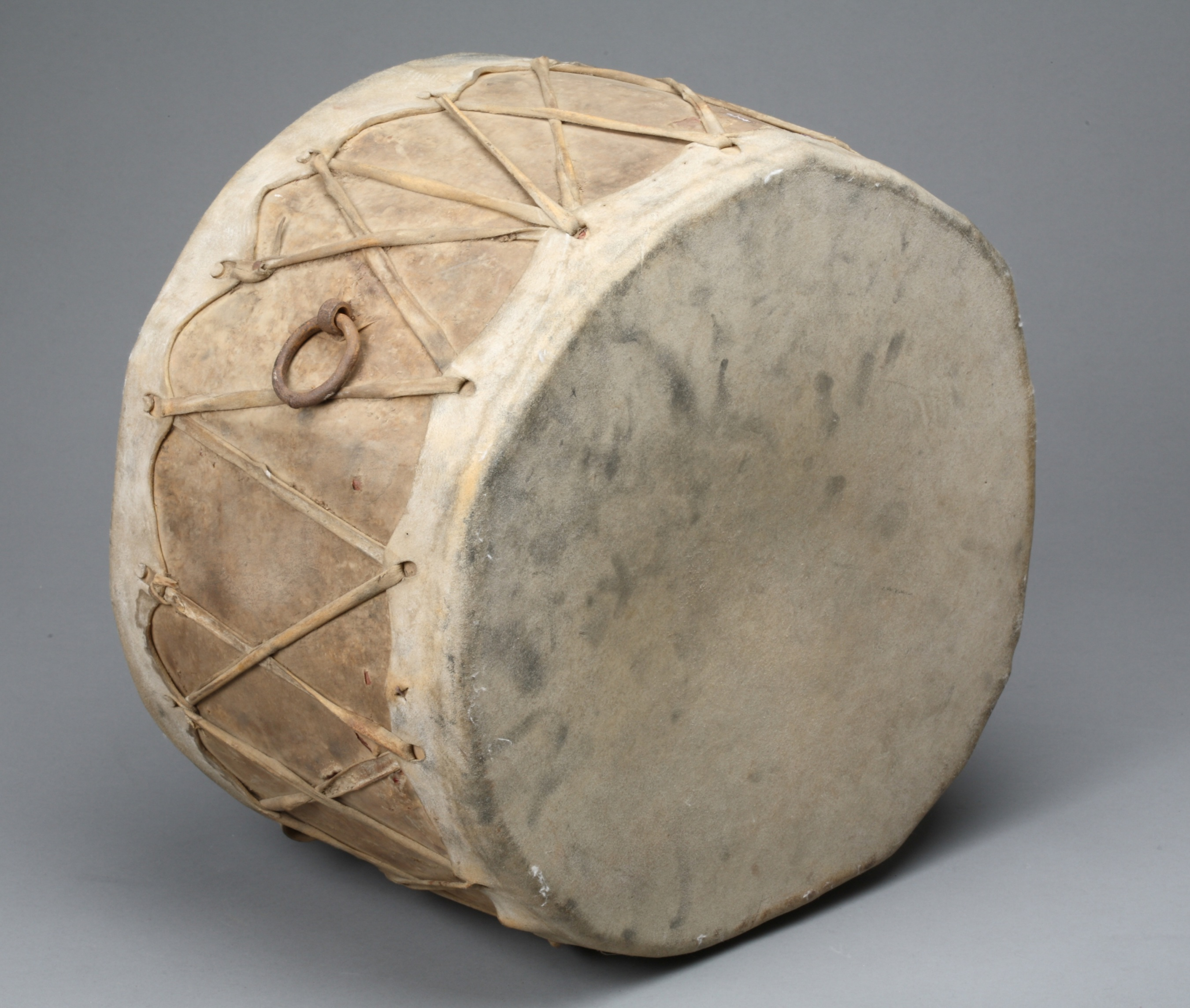
Pungmul-buk

== See also ==
- Traditional Korean musical instruments
- Korean drum
- Korean barrel drum

== Bibliography ==
- Samguk Sagi
- Goryeosa
- Book of Sui
- Akhak Gwebeom
- 민요와 향토악기 (장사훈, 상문당, 1948)
- 국악개요 (장사훈, 정연사, 1961)
- 한국음악사전 (대한민국예술원, 1985)
- 국악대사전 (장사훈, 세광음악출판사, 1984)
