= Tampa United Korean School =

Korean school in Florida, United States

Coordinates: 28.00259°N 82.46278°W

Tampa United Korean School logo.

The Tampa United Korean School (TUKS) was formed on March 5, 1995, when local Korean schools in the Tampa area were merged to make in improved centre for Korean language and cultural education. TUKS is a registered non-profit organization in Florida.

TUKS offers classes on Korean language, culture and history, by teaching the various levels of Korean language (Hangul) courses and having events on Korean traditional holidays: Chuseok-Korean (Thanksgiving Day), Solnal-Korean (New Year's Day), and Korean Alphabet (Hangul) Day. Other special events are offered throughout the semester such as 'Word contest', 'Storytelling contest', 'Singing contest', 'Drawing contest'. Extracurricular activities include learning Hangul though Korean children's songs, traditional Korean art, taekwondo, both Korean barrel drum and Korean traditional janggu drum, and traditional Korean dance.

TUKS is a member of "The National Association for Korean Schools" and "The Florida Association for Korean Schools".
