= Nodo =

Nodo or NODO may refer to:

- NASA Orbital Debris Observatory, New Mexico, US
- No-Do (Noticiarios y Documentales), a state-controlled series of cinema newsreels produced in Spain
- Nodo (drum), a Korean musical instrument
- NoDo (North Downtown), an area of downtown Omaha, Nebraska
