= Beopgonori =

Korean Buddhist drumming dance

Beopgonori (Korean: 법고놀이) is a type of traditional Korean performance. In the performance, a drummer plays the beopgo (법고; 法鼓; lit. Dharma drum), a small drum, while dancing. The name beopgo originally refers to one of the four Buddhist instruments. In the late Joseon period, Buddhist monks often went about asking for alms with a dharma drum set up on the roadside or formed a nongak (farmers' music) band and begged for rice. These monks were called beopgo monks (drumming monks) or gutjungpae, meaning a group of monks who played percussion music to raise money.

== Procedure ==
According to "Dongguk sesigi" ("A Record of the Seasonal Customs of the Eastern Kingdom"), beopgo is the practice of Buddhist monks coming into the city carrying a drum and going from house to house as they beat the drum. It is written in "Hanyangsesigi" ("A Record of the Seasonal Customs of Hanyang") that beopgo monks, wearing straw hats and playing the drum and gong, also wearing a flower made of blue feathers and paper like a hair rod and a yellow Buddhist robe, and holding two halves of a seal called bujeol, gather on the streets of a village and dance in a circle like actors or clowns to beg for grains in order to present an offering to Buddha. The above-described geollip, or fund-raising performance, carried out by beopgo monks has aspects similar to pangut (entertainment-oriented performance combining music, dance, and acrobatics). Although the Buddhist drum called beopgo and the drum of the same name used in nongak are different, and the name was adopted because of the cultural authority of Buddhist musical instruments and hence their easy acceptance by the people. A similar name, beokgu, was also derived from beopgo in this process.

== In modern culture ==
On a nationwide basis, beopgonori is often used as another name for sogonori (hand-held drum performance). Just as the percussionists (chibae) performing sogonori are called sogo or beopgu players in Gochang, North Jeolla Province, the name beopgo (beokgu) is used interchangeably with sogo. Depending on the attire, the performance is called chaesangbeokgu if the player wears a chaesangmo (twirling-streamer hat), and gokkalbeokgu if the player wears a peaked hat (gokkal). In some areas, both the beopgo and sogo are included in the composition of nongak, in which case they are distinguished from each other. In Gangneung Nongak and Busan Ami Nongak, for example, the two drums are used as different instruments. Gangneung nongak features eight each of the sogo and beopgo (beokgu), the bigger drums called sogo and the smaller ones beopgo.

== Description of the instrument ==
The sogo is less than 30 cm in diameter, and the beopgo less than 20 cm. The sogo has a wooden handle, and in the past five pieces of thin iron plate were attached to the handle to produce a metallic sound whenever the drum was struck. Unlike the sogo, in Gangneung the beopgo does not have a handle but is held by winding a string around the hand. It is also known as mijigi. On the southern coast of Korea, beokgu is used as a term for buk (barrel drum). One of the remarkable features of nongak in the southern coastal region is bungnori (drum performance), also called beokkunori or beokgunori. Solo beokgunori has evolved to show greater artistry than collective performance as the drummer can demonstrate his skills unrestricted by other performers.

== Popularity ==
As a performance featuring numerous players, beopgonori produces representative scenes expressing the collective artistic ecstasy and exhilaration of nongak. Chaesangbeopgo is a visual feast of technical and artistic skills accompanied by witnoreum (spinning-streamer hat performance), while gokkalbeopgo exhibits the appeal of collective performance with many people vigorously moving in unison and keeping time with one another and also performing araetnoreum (feet-centered play). In some regions beopgonori is also called sogonori or bungnori. In some areas, a drum smaller than the sogo is distinguished as beopgo. As the Buddhist musical instrument called beopgo has been accepted widely yet on a case-to-case basis, its name has taken on a regional character. Beopgonori testifies that in as much as nongak has a history of being passed down in relation to Buddhism its performance has great expandability. (Song, Kue-jin. "The Real Face of Korean Buddhism under Japanese Colonial Rule." Journal of Korean Religions 10, no. 2 (2019): 275–99. Accessed March 13, 2021. doi:10.2307/26894715.)
