= Yu (percussion instrument) =

Musical instrument

- Chinese: 敔
Transcriptions
Standard Mandarin
- Hanyu Pinyin: yǔ
- Wade–Giles: yü
Yue: Cantonese
- Jyutping: jyu5

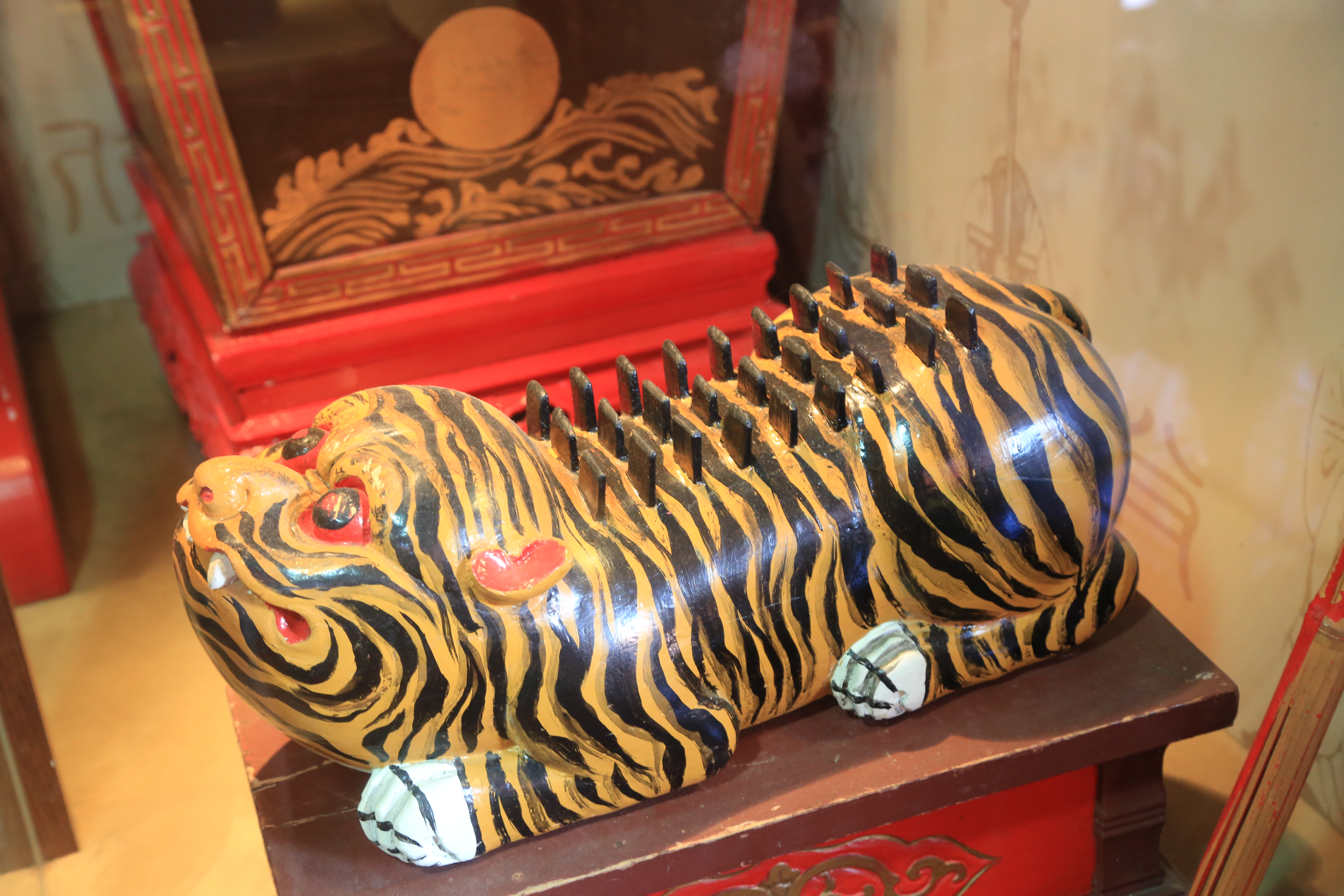
A yu in the Taiwan Confucian Temple

The yu is an idiophonic tiger-shaped percussion instrument that was used in yayue, the ritual music of ancient China's Zhou dynasty.

== Form ==
The yu is a hollow wooden box shaped and usually painted to resemble a tiger. The back is serrated with 27 teeth, sometimes positioned to match the stripes of the tiger.

== Performance ==
The yu is played with a bamboo whisk with about 15 tines. The whisk is used to strike the head and to run across the serrated back.

== Use ==
In antiquity, the yu was used to mark the end of a piece of music. The head was struck three times and then the back was crossed once to bring the music to a close. This contrasted with the zhu, a tapered hollow box whose inner bottom surface was struck to mark the beginning of music. Both instruments appear in Zhou-era annals and the Classic of History but are now rarely used, with surviving examples usually simply displayed in museums and Confucian temples. The Classic of Music that instructed creation and use of the yayue instruments is almost entirely lost, and aspects of modern construction and performance are guesswork or replacement. Nonetheless, a few temples—including the main Taiwan Confucian Temple—still use them for Confucian ceremonies. The reconstructed form is also used in Shaoxing Opera.

== Legacy ==
The Korean eo is essentially identical to the yu and continues to be used in Korean ritual music. The Vietnamese ngu (Vietnamese: ngữ or 敔) is also essentially identical to the yu.

== See also ==
- Raganella
