= Zhu (percussion instrument) =

Ancient Chinese musical instrument

- Zhu in seal script
- Chinese: 柷
Transcriptions
Standard Mandarin
- Hanyu Pinyin: zhù
- Wade–Giles: chu

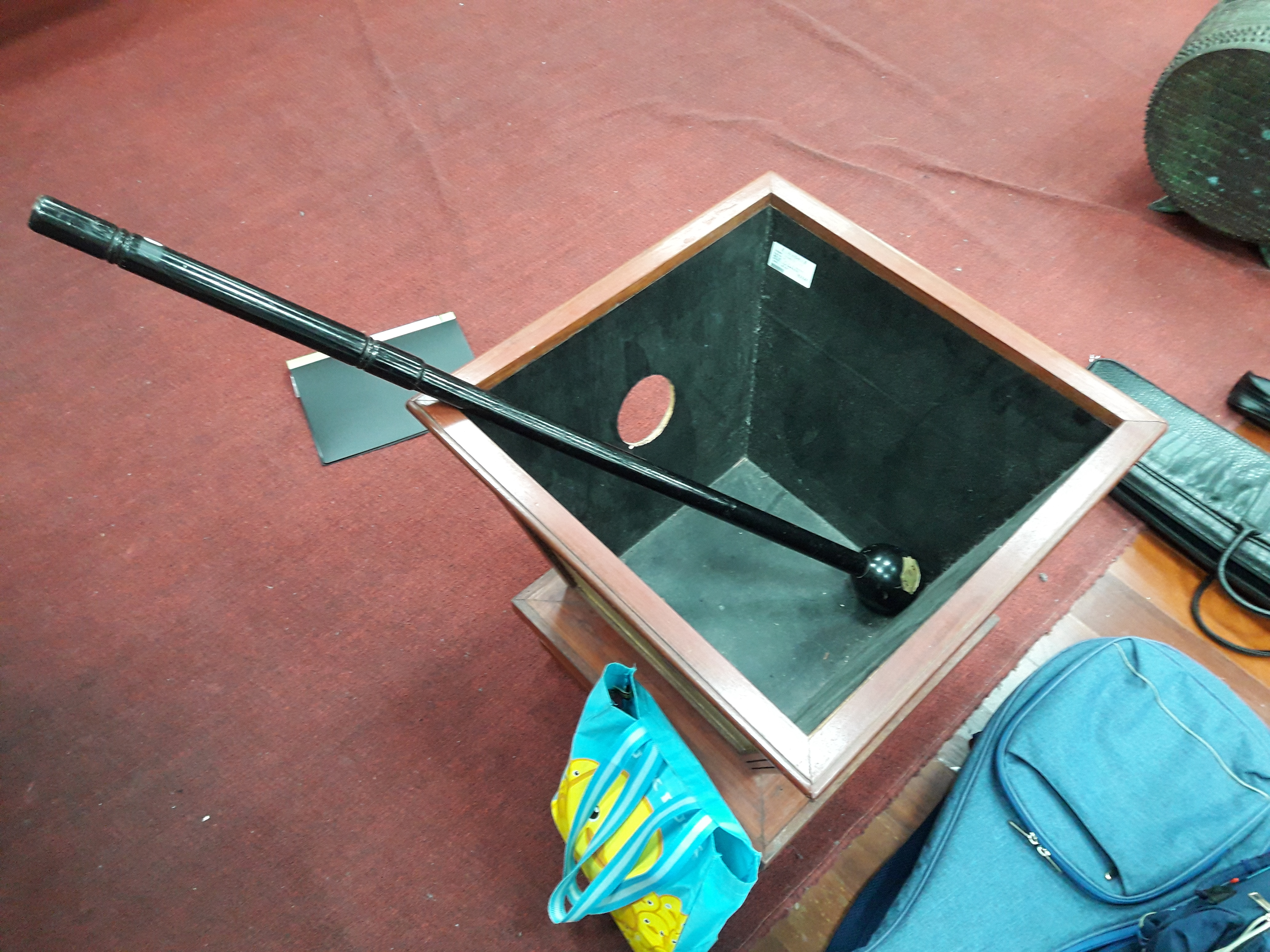
A reconstruction of a zhu at university in Tainan on Taiwan.

The zhu is an idiophonic percussion instrument that was used in yayue, the ritual music of ancient China's Zhou dynasty.

== Form ==
The zhu is a wooden box, typically painted red or otherwise decorated, that tapers from top to bottom.

== Performance ==
The zhu is played by grasping a wooden stick and using it to strike the top of the zhu's inner bottom surface.

== Use ==
In antiquity, the zhu was used to mark the beginning of a piece of music. This contrasted with the tiger-shaped yu, played by striking the top of its head and crossing the ridges along its back, used to mark the end of the music. Both instruments appear in Zhou-era annals and the Classic of History but are now rarely used, with surviving examples usually simply displayed in museums and Confucian temples. The Classic of Music that instructed creation and use of the yayue instruments is almost entirely lost, and aspects of modern construction and performance are guesswork or replacement. Nonetheless, a few temples—including the main Taiwan Confucian Temple—still use them for Confucian ceremonies.

== Legacy ==
The Korean chuk is essentially identical to the zhu and continues to be used in Korean ritual music. Unlike many Chinese reconstructions of the zhu, which are typically open at the top, the chuk is frequently covered and the performer strikes the bottom of the instrument through a hole for that purpose.

== See also ==
- List of traditional Chinese musical instruments
