= Tongguksesigi =

Korean book from the Joseon period (1849)

Tongguksesigi (Korean: 동국세시기; Hanja: 東國歲時記) is a Korean language book from the Joseon period that explains seasonal customs in Korea. It was written by the scholar Hong Sŏngmo (홍석모; 洪錫謨) and finished in 1849.
