= Munmyo =

Confucian temple in Seoul, South Korea

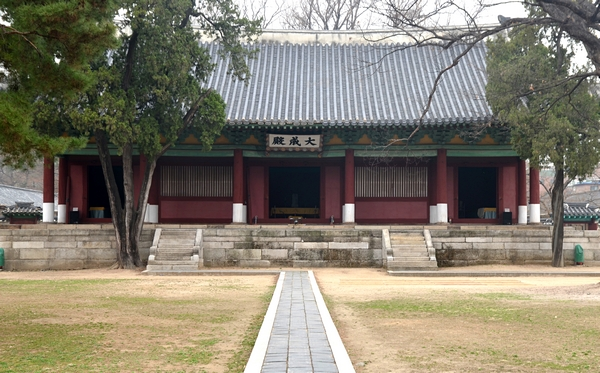
- Daeseongjeon in Munmyo

Religion
- Affiliation: Confucianism

Location
- Location: 53 Myeongnyun-dong 3(sam)-ga, Jongno District, Seoul, South Korea
- Interactive map of Munmyo
- Coordinates: 37°35′07″N 126°59′48″E

Architecture
- Type: Temple, Hall
- Established: 1398
- Historic Sites of South Korea
- Designated: 1964-11-10
- Reference no.: 143

Korean name
- Hangul: 문묘
- Hanja: 文廟
- RR: Munmyo
- MR: Munmyo

Munmyo (Korean: 문묘; Hanja: 文廟; lit. 'Temple of Confucius'), also called Seoul Munmyo or Seonggyungwan Munmyo, is Korea's primary temple of Confucius. It is located in central Seoul, South Korea, on the campus of Sungkyunkwan University.

Munmyo houses a shrine to Confucius known as Daeseongjeon, or "Hall of Great Achievement." The main gate leading to the shrine Sinsammun, literally "Spirit Three Gate", is open only on special occasions such as Seokjeon Daeje. The central gate is reserved for the spirit of Confucius and his disciple, and no one else may enter through this gate. Past this gate is the central path that leads to Daeseongjeon, and visitors may not cross this path, especially during a ceremony when the gates are open. The courtyard is used for the Seokjeon Daeje ceremony. Munmyo also contains two other halls (Dongmu and Seomu, east and west hall), two dormitories (Dongjae and Seojae, east and west dormitories), a Confucian lecture hall called Myeongnyundang, a library called Cheonggyeongdang, and Jinsasikdang which is the dining hall.

== History ==
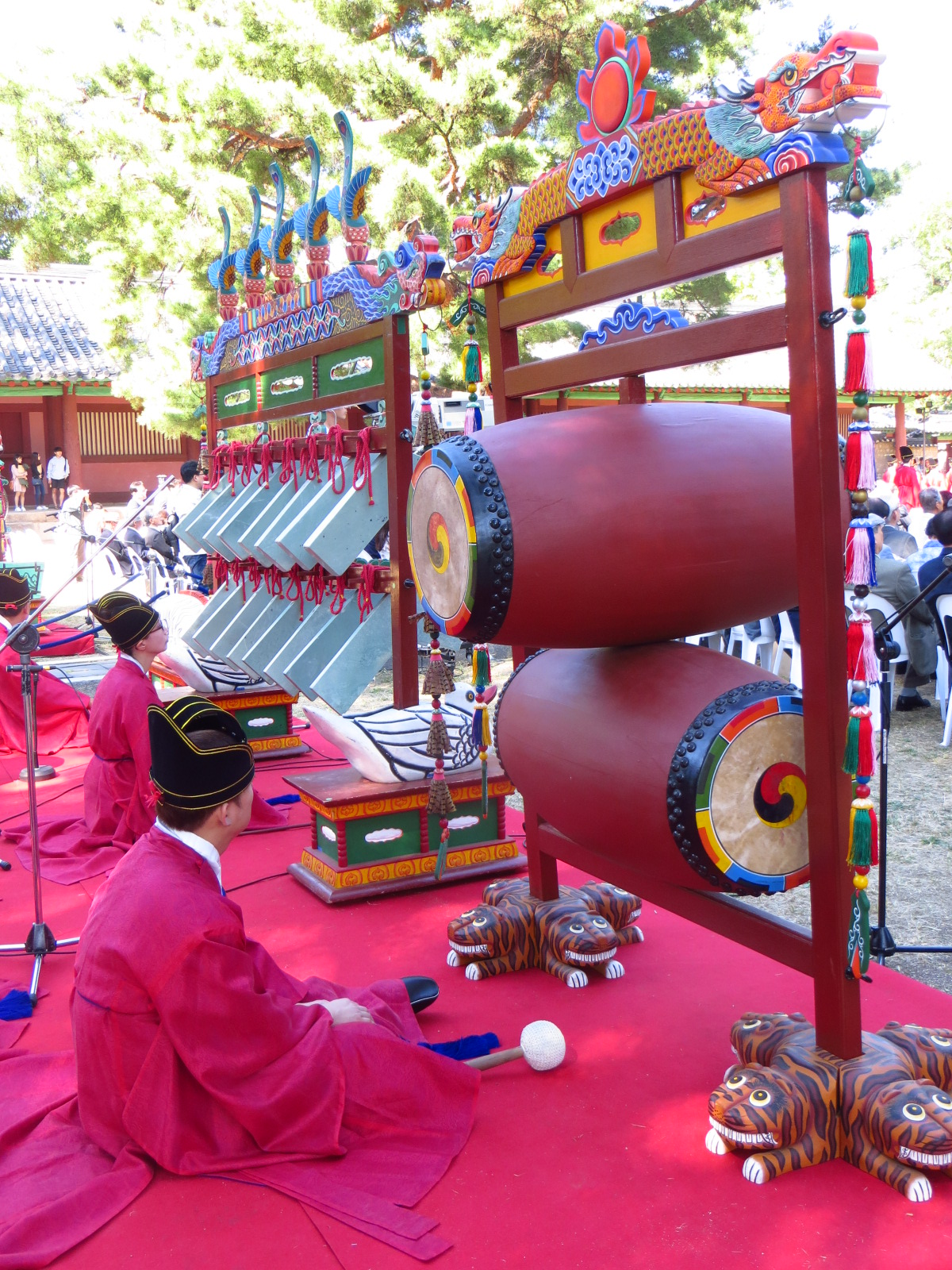
Aak musicians at Munmyo Shrine with stone chimes and drums

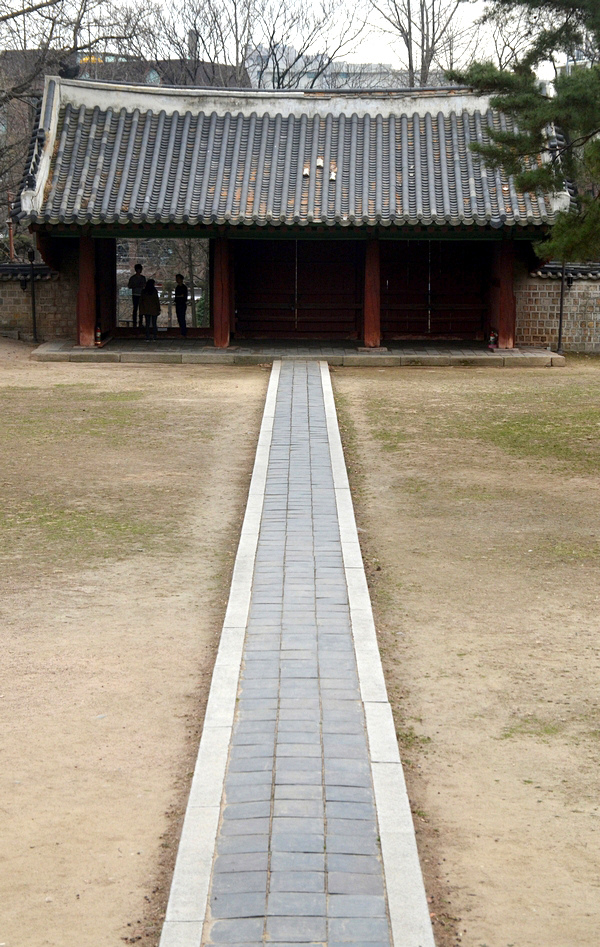
The gate of Sinsammun

The Munmyo is based on Confucian practices from China, where Confucius and followers of his teachings were honored and venerated. Temples dedicated to Confucius and other disciples called "temples of Confucius" became widespread during the Tang dynasty. This idea was brought to Korea where it was adopted. The buildings of Munmyo were first constructed in 1398, but they were destroyed in a fire in 1400, and rebuilt in 1407. The temple was again destroyed during Japanese invasions of Korea in 1592–1598, and the Daeseongjeon was rebuilt in 1601, and Myeongnyundang in 1606 with funds raised by students of Sŏnggyun'gwan. Repairs to the temple were conducted in 1869.

Apart from Confucius, the four closest associates of Confucius (Yan Hui, Zengzi, Zisi, Mencius), ten philosophers praised by Confucius, six Song dynasty neo-Confucians are also honoured in the temple. Also enshrined in the temple are 18 notable Korean confucians called the "Eighteen Sages of Korea" or the "Eighteen Confucian Scholars of the East" (Korean: 동방18현; Hanja: 東方十八賢), or Canonised Sages (配享先生). They are, in the chronological order of enshrinement: Ch'oe Ch'i-wŏn, Seol Chong, An Hyang, Chŏng Mong-ju, Kim Koengp'il, Chŏng Yŏch'ang, Cho Kwangjo, Yi Ŏnjŏk, Yi Hwang, Cho Hŏn, Yi I, Sŏng Hon, Kim Jang-saeng, Song Si-yŏl, Song Chun-gil, Pak Sech'ae, Kim Inhu, and Kim Jip.

== Present ==
A ritual Munmyo jerye (Korean: 문묘제례; Hanja: 文廟祭禮) or Seokjeon Daeje, which involves music and dance, is held there each year in the spring (April) and autumn (September); the ritual features ancient music of Chinese origin called Munmyo jeryeak (Korean: 문묘제례악; Hanja: 文廟祭禮樂), which is a form of aak.

The musicians are provided by the National Gugak Center. The instruments used include flutes (hun, so, and bamboo flutes), zithers (seul and geum), stone chimes (pyeongyeong), bronze bells (pyeonjong), various drums played with sticks, tiger-shaped wooden scraper (eo), wooden box (chuk), and wooden clappers (bak).

Munmyo is designated by the South Korean government as Historic Site No. 143.

== See also ==
- Korean Confucianism
- Confucius
- Aak
- Jongmyo
- Kongmiao, Beijing
