= Chuk (instrument) =

Musical instrument

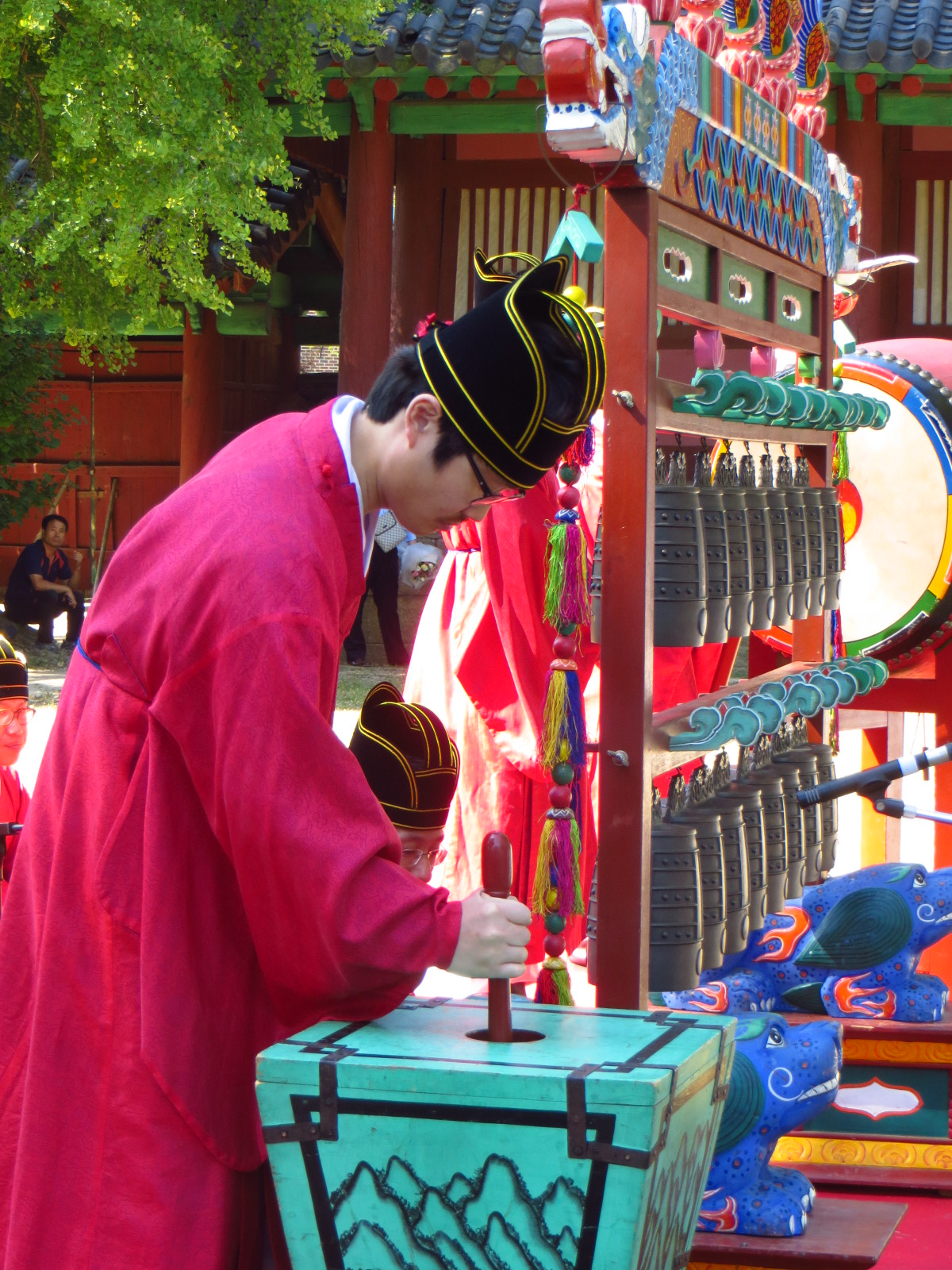
- Chuk, Korean traditional instrument used in court and ritual music
- Classification: Idiophone

Related instruments
- Zhu

The chuk (Korean: 축; Hanja: 柷) is a traditional Korean musical instrument used in Confucian (Munmyo) and Royal Ancestral Shrine (Jongmyo) ceremonies to signal the beginning of a ritual music performance. It is played at the beginning of music, meaning that the music begins by opening the sky and the ground. It consists of a square wooden box, played by striking the bottom with a mallet to mark beats or sections. The chuk is derived from the Chinese zhu, and was imported from the Song dynasty of China to Goryeo.

== See also ==
- Traditional Korean musical instruments
