= Junggo =

Populated place in Batu, East Java, Indonesia

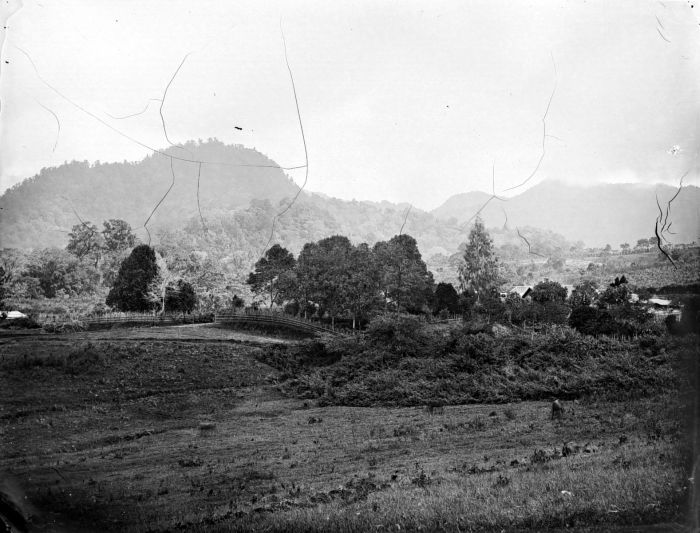
Coffee plantation in Junggo

Junggo is a populated place in Batu, East Java, Indonesia.
