= Eo (instrument) =

Korean percussion instrument

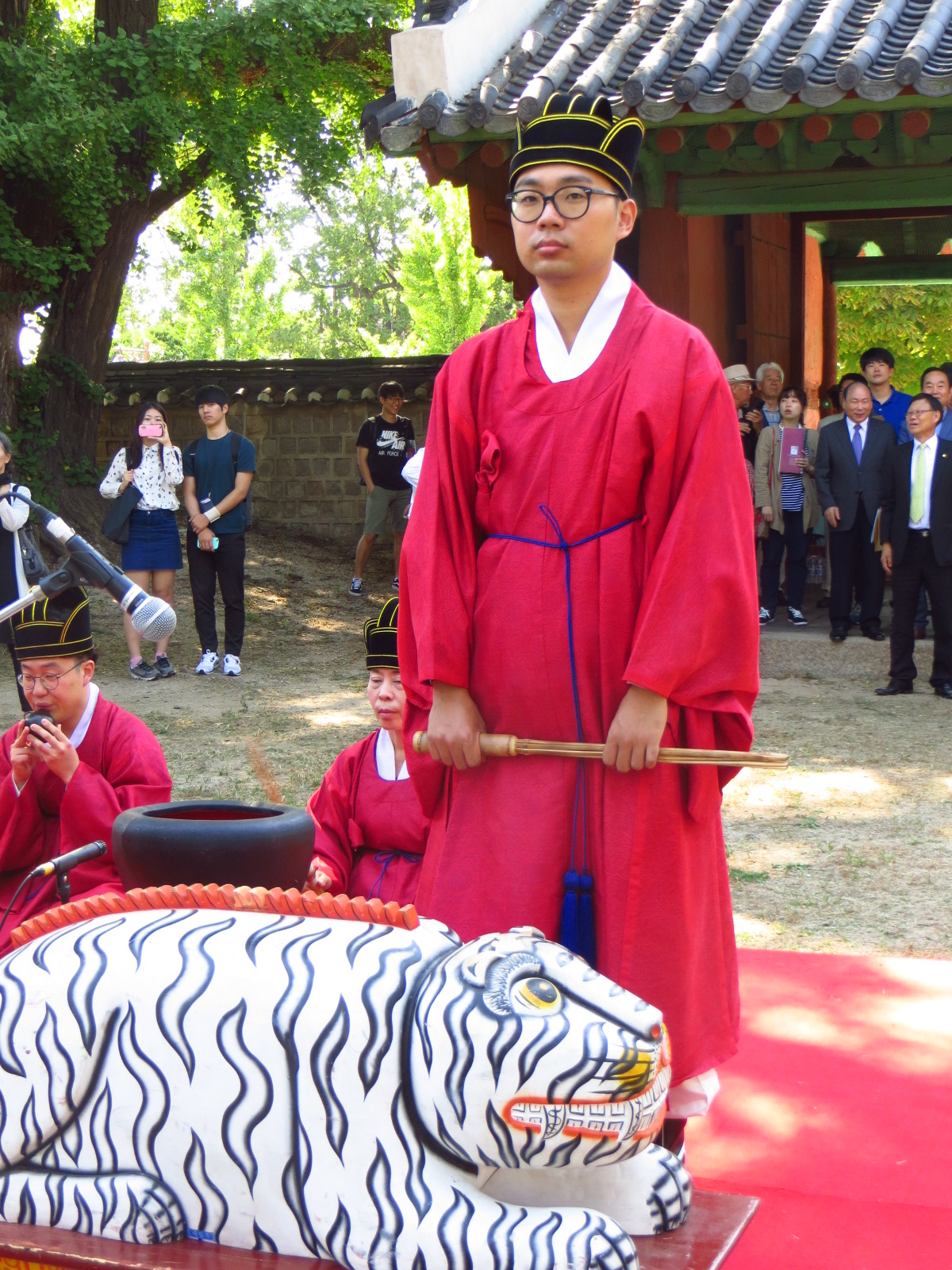
Eo, a percussion traditional Korean court and ritual instrument

The eo (Korean: 어; Hanja: 敔) or tiger is a wooden percussion instrument carved in the shape of a tiger with a serrated back, played by running a bamboo whisk across the serrations. The instrument is often played to punctuate the ends of sections of music. It is derived from the Chinese yu. On the back of the tiger is a jeoeo (저어, 齟齬) that looks like 27 saws. When the music stops, the performer knocks and scratches this jeoeo through the jin (진) and gives a signal.
