= Nodo (drum) =

Traditional Korean drums on a pole

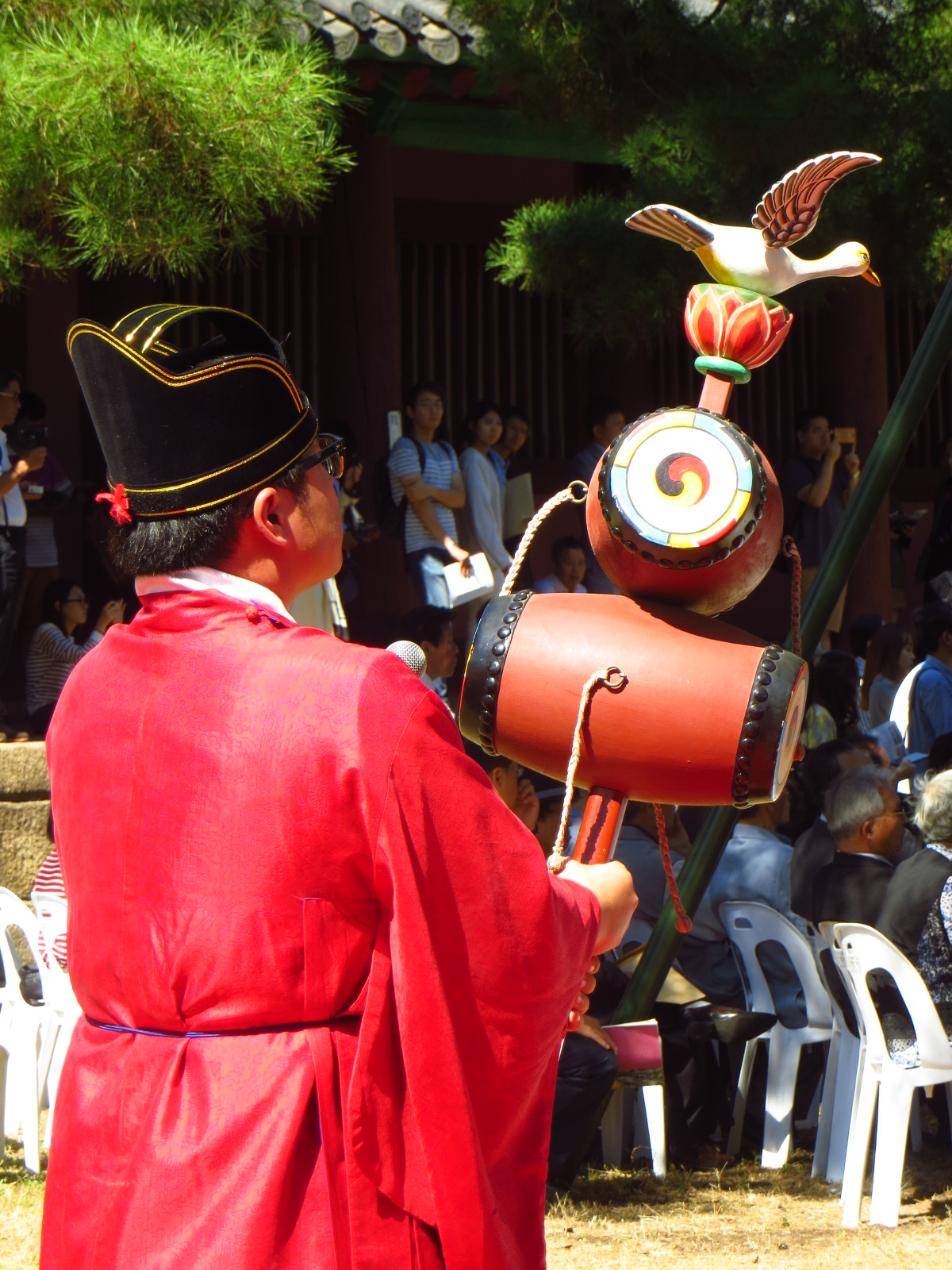
Confucian ritual held at Munmyo Shrine, Sungkyunkwan seowon

Nodo (Korean: 노도; Hanja: 路鼗) is an instrument in Korean traditional music. It is a set of two small drums on a pole. To play the nodo, the pole is twisted, which causes the leather strap attached to the ring of the drum to hit the drum and make a sound. It is used in Korean ritual and court music. The nogo, which is similar to the Nodo, has two larger drums and is used in the same ceremonies.

It is effectively a four-sided drum and is used for ancestral rites.
