= Nogo (drum) =

Traditional Korean drum set

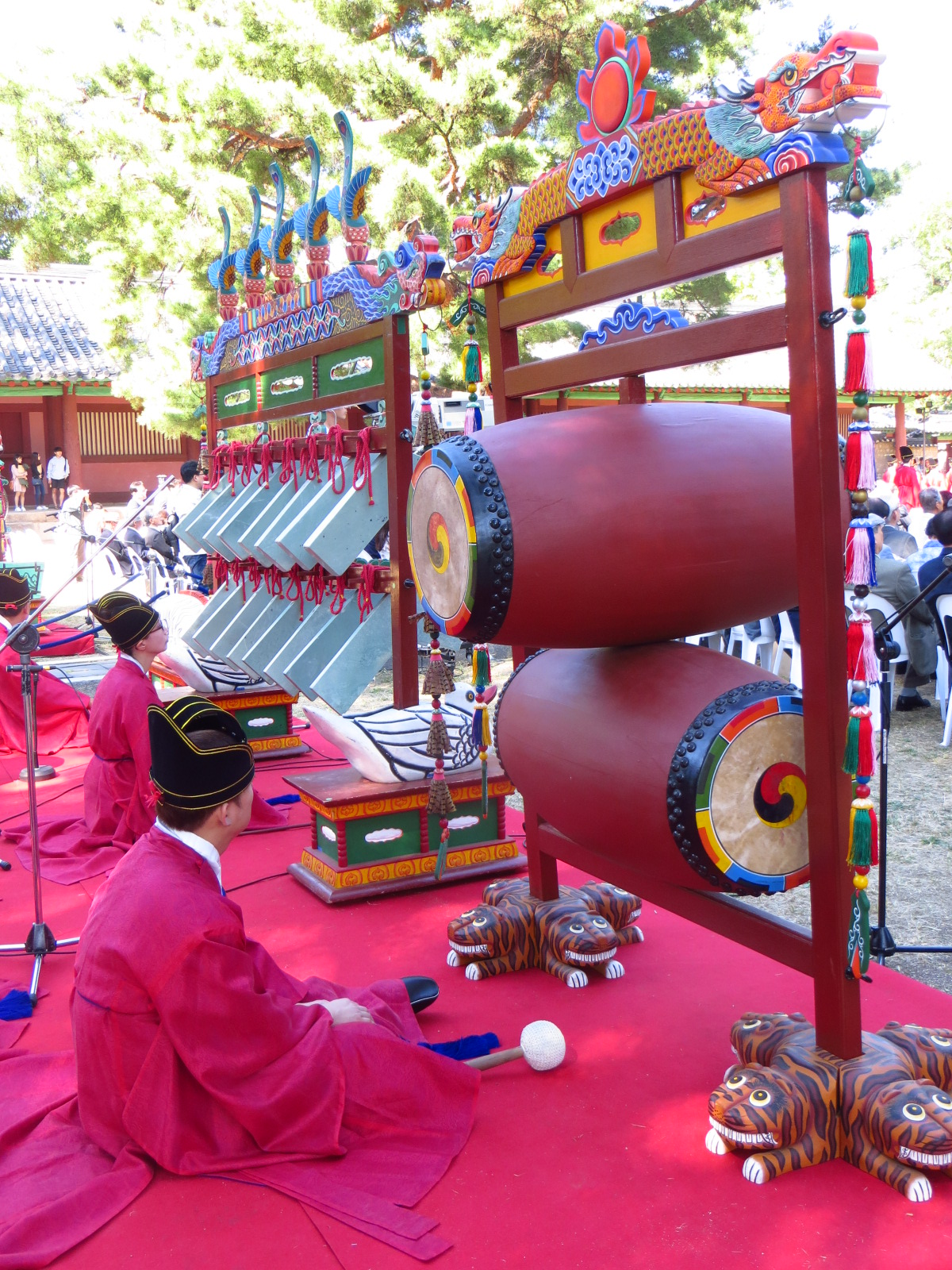
- Confucian ritual at Munmyo Shrine, Sungkyunkwan seowon.

Percussion instrument
- Other names: Korean: 노고; Hanja: 路鼓
- Classification: unpitched percussion

Nogo (Korean: 노고; Hanja: 路鼓) is a set of two drums pierced by a pole and mounted on a frame. It is played during Korean Confucian ancestral rites (in Korean court and ritual music).
