= Ancestral Temple =

Ancestral Temple may refer to:

- Ancestral shrines, Chinese temples or halls dedicated to deified ancestors
- Ancestral Temple (TV series), a 2009 Chinese TV series

== Tourist attractions ==
- Imperial Ancestral Temple, a temple in the Imperial City, Beijing, China
- Foshan Ancestral Temple, a temple in Foshan, Guangdong, China
- Thế Miếu, a temple in the Imperial City, Huế, Thừa Thiên-Huế, Vietnam
- Triệu Tổ miếu, another temple in the Imperial City, Huế, Thừa Thiên-Huế, Vietnam

== See also ==
- Ancestor veneration in China
