= Miếu =

Mieu or Miếu may refer to:

== Places ==
- Thế Miếu, a shrine in Hue, Vietnam
- Triệu Tổ miếu, a tomb in Hue, Vietnam
- Văn Miếu, a temple in Hanoi, Vietnam
  - Văn Miếu – Quốc Tử Giám (ward), a ward in Hanoi, Vietnam

== Ethnic group ==
- Mieu people

== See also ==
- 廟 (disambiguation)
