= 廟 =

廟, literally "shrine" or "temple" in East Asian countries, may refer to:

- Miao shrine (simplified Chinese: 庙; traditional Chinese: 廟) for Chinese places
- Miếu (disambiguation) (chữ Hán: 廟) for Vietnamese places
- Myo shrine (Korean: 묘; Hanja: 廟) for Korean places
- Reibyō (disambiguation) (Japanese: 霊廟) for Japanese places

== See also ==
- Confucian royal ancestral shrine
