= Confucian royal ancestral shrine =

Worship of royal ancestors in East Asia

Chinese name
- Traditional Chinese: 宗廟
- Simplified Chinese: 宗庙
Transcriptions
Standard Mandarin
- Hanyu Pinyin: Zongmiao

Vietnamese name
- Vietnamese alphabet: Tông miếu
- Chữ Hán: 宗廟

Korean name
- Hangul: 종묘
- Hanja: 宗廟
Transcriptions
- Revised Romanization: Jongmyo

Japanese name
- Hiragana: そうびょう
- Kyūjitai: 宗廟
Transcriptions
- Romanization: Sōbyō

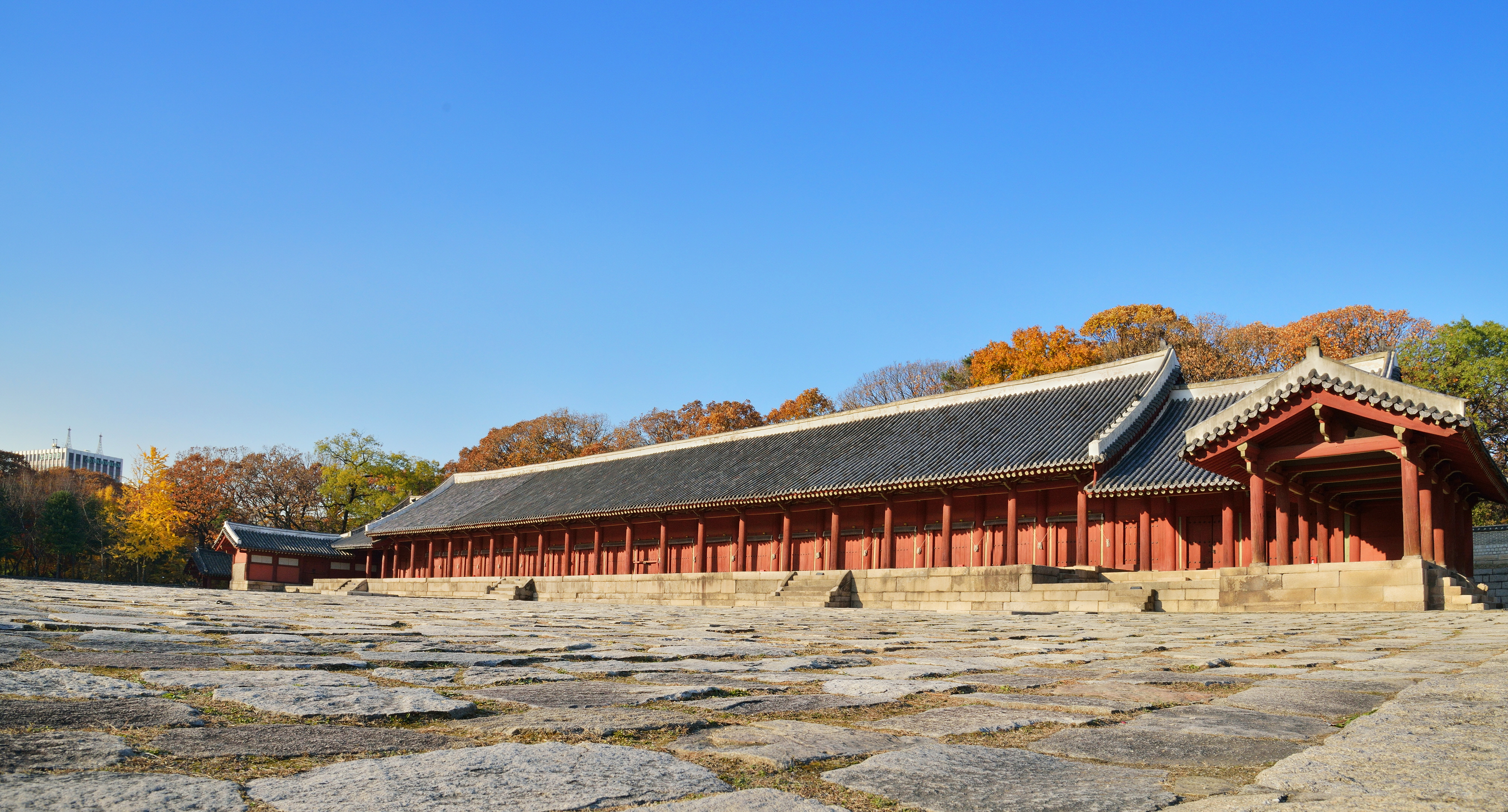
Joseon's Jongmyo

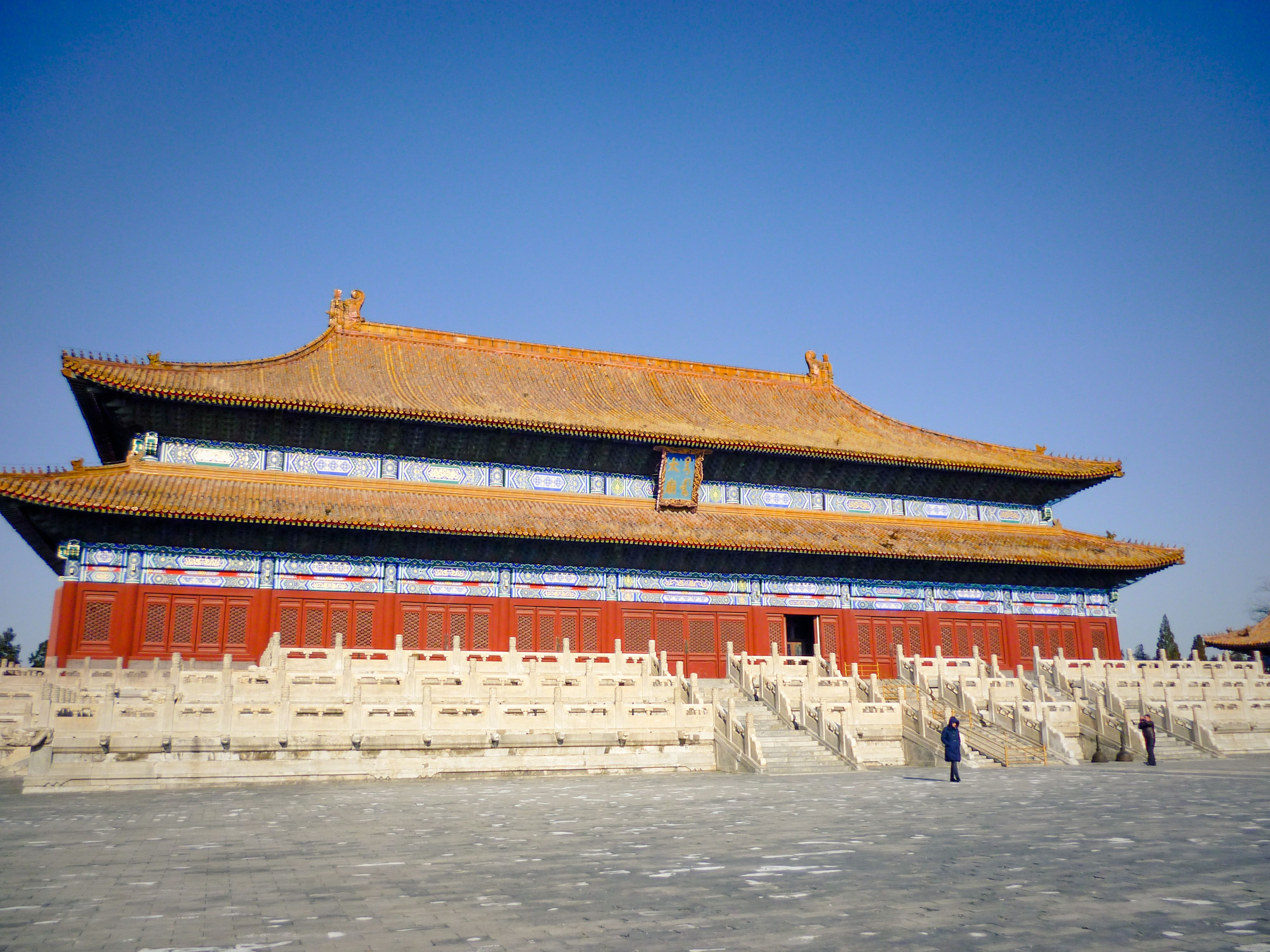
Ming·Qing's Imperial Ancestral Temple

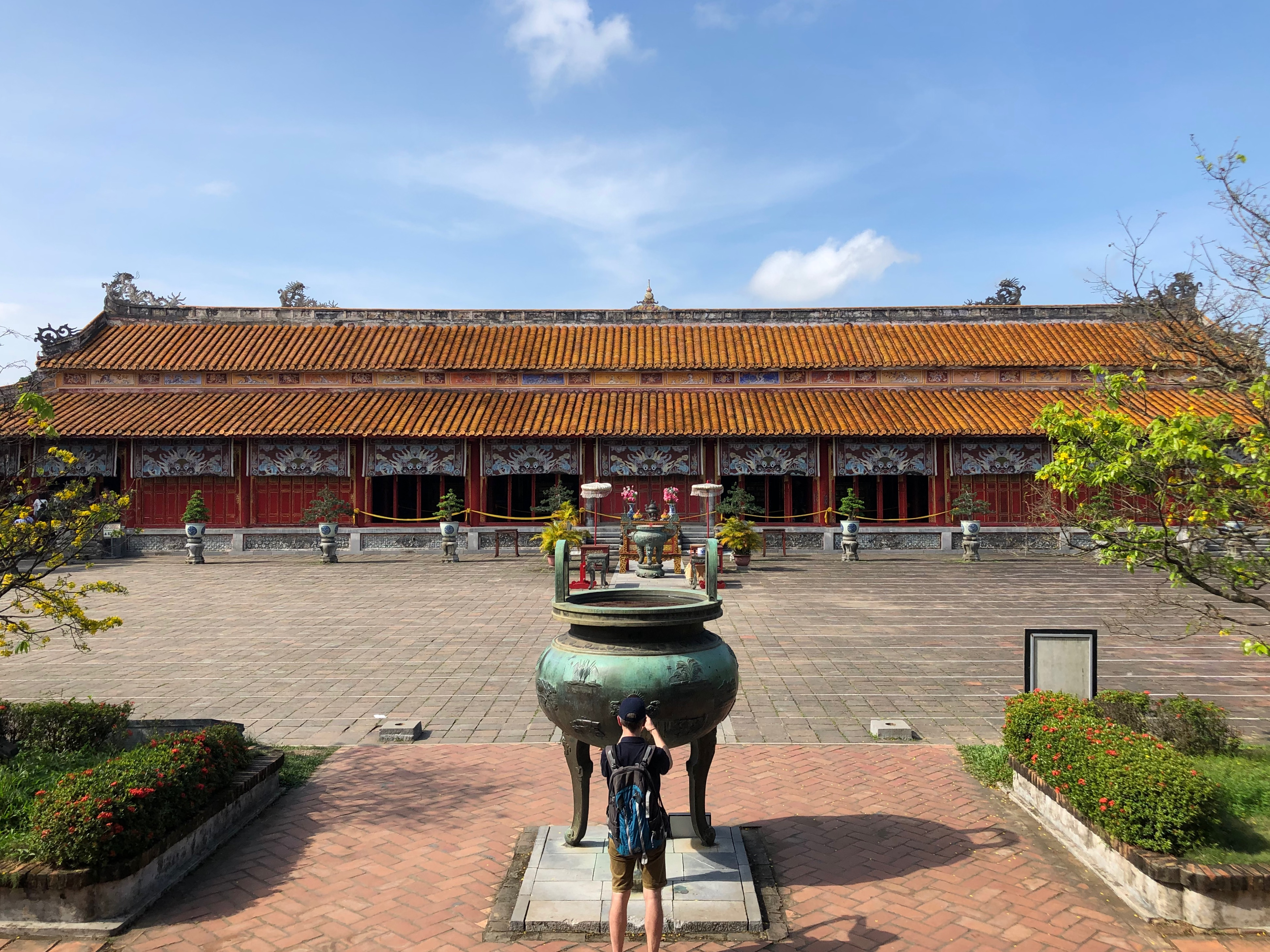
Đại Nam Quốc's Thế Miếu

The Confucian royal ancestral shrine (Chinese and Japanese: 宗廟制; pinyin: zōngmiàozhì; Korean: 종묘제; romaja: Jongmyoje) is a system of Confucian worship for royal ancestors in the East Asian region. Originating from Chinese culture, it was later redeveloped among countries in East Asian cultural sphere as cultural diffusion. Nowadays this system can be seen in sites such as 'Jongmyo', designated as UNESCO World Heritage Site in 1995.

Due to its importance in Confucian feudal monarchy, the term '宗廟' (Hanyu Pinyin: zōngmiào; Korean pronunciation: Jongmyo) in respective Sinosphere countries, together with the soil and grain, was used as metaphor to refer to national sovereignty and national honor in the old time.

== Systematic features and overview ==
Confucian royal ancestral shrines have distinct, systematic features separate from general concept of 'venerating dead'. First, the system is not a veneration of dead body in tomb, but a religious worship to spirit tablets of royal ancestors. Second, the system tries to limit the number of ancestors available to become object of worship under delicate Confucian protocols. So the protocols should include detailed rules about which and how many ancestors can be worshiped or who should be get rid out of shrine to satisfy the limit, and this rule is concretely reflected to architectures of shrine buildings and connected to cultural institutions as temple names (廟號). This protocol distinguishes concept of 'Confucian royal ancestral shrine' zōngmiào (宗廟) from concept of simple 'ancestral shrine' (始祖廟; shǐzǔmiào, 祠堂; cítáng).

While there is no doubt that this whole system is originated from the Chinese civilization, it is also redeveloped in other East Asian civilizations like Korea and Vietnam through cultural diffusion. Yet as the Chinese civilization has experienced relatively frequent change of dynasties, and gone through even conversion and renovation of cultural sites like the 'Imperial Ancestral Temple' into modern recreation facility named 'Working People's Cultural Palace' in 1950, the Jongmyo of Joseon dynasty has gone through relatively little political changes, preserving the oldest and most authentic form of the Confucian royal ancestral shrine.

== By civilization ==
=== China ===
While old classics like Book of Rites and Rites of Zhou state that invention of the Confucian royal ancestral shrine system dates back to ages of Western Zhou, earliest evidence of stable practice under relatively rigid Confucian protocols is found in era of Eastern Han, when two major principles governing the system are materialized.

The first major principle of the system is 'Separate rooms within single building' (同堂異室), introduced in the reign of Emperor Ming (明帝). Before Emperor Ming, Chinese emperors construct not only a single 'Confucian royal ancestral shrine' building in the capital city, but also built separate miao shrine for worshiping his ancestor near each of ancestor's royal tomb where dead body of ancestor lies. By Emperor Ming, old practice had changed into constructing only one shrine building in the capital city, while introducing separate rooms as miao (廟) for keeping each of ancestor's spirit tablet. This concentration of worshipping place into the capital city reflects a cultural understanding that the Emperor is not just venerating his family ancestor, but worshipping a God-Ancestor selected by Confucian protocols.

Second major principle is 'Son of Heaven worships 7 preceding ancestors' (天子七廟), introduced in the reign of Emperor Zhang (章帝). This principle connotes two different nuance of meaning. One is devising social hierarchy, meaning that the number of ancestors available to become object of worship varies by social hierarchy, as only the Emperor (Son of Heaven) can worship 7 ancestors, while the Kings of States can worship 5 ancestors and the Scholar-officials can worship 3 ancestors. Another is limiting excessive expenditure of government on ritual ceremonies, that even the Emperor cannot worship more than 7 ancestors. The latter meaning leads the system to develop a strict rule on who should be inducted to limited slot of roster. The most famous rule for the Emperor's 7 ancestors, connected to the protocol of temple name, is having one progenitor (祖), two selected virtuous ancestors (宗), and four direct preceding ancestors (親) of current Emperor. This rule is practically implemented by Cai Yong during the age of Dong Zhuo's military government. Yet the second principle got often neglected by the Emperors, as they wanted to keep his every ancestors in the shrine building forever. For example, in Tang dynasty, Emperor Xuanzong expanded number of rooms in the Confucian royal ancestral shrine from seven to nine. This phenomenon also happened in Qing dynasty.

Following the major two principles consolidated in Eastern Han, another detailed but rather minor principles were introduced to the Confucian royal ancestral system during Yuan dynasty, on matter of choosing order (昭穆) to arrange rooms of ancestors.

The existing protocol before Yuan dynasty was placing ancestor with higher position in lineage from west to east, since the west side was considered higher than east side for them. Yet this practice was challenged from conservative Confucian ideologists, because the founding Emperor as the only progenitor (祖) should be treated higher than any other ancestors, even higher than preceding fathers of such founding Emperor, who were not Emperor in their lifetime but commemorated as Emperor posthumously. This strict understanding of hierarchy inside the God-Ancestors of empire, led the system of Confucian royal ancestral shrine to arrange room for spirit tablets of royal ancestors as following; the sole progenitor goes to center, and place following ancestors (according to the relative hierarchy inside the lineage) left and right of the progenitor alternately.

Another important revision made in Yuan dynasty was change of architectural style. Spirit tablet of the Emperor's ancestor (and also a predecessor) who were not given immovable status inside the main shrine building were later replaced to different shrine buildings (祧廟), yet protocol of how to operate such buildings was not stable. Reforms in Yuan dynasty introduced constructing new two annex buildings, in front and behind of the main shrine building (which is keeping only 7 miao rooms for ancestors) respectively. While the frontside building functioned as hall for holding worshipping ceremonies, the backside building functioned as resting place where spirit tablet of ancestors removed from the main building comes in. This new architectural style of three buildings (三殿), was continued to late Chinese empires Ming and Qing. It is still can be observed in present-day remnants of the 'Imperial Ancestral Temple' as 'Working People's Cultural Palace' in Beijing.

=== Korea ===
The system of Confucian royal ancestral shrine invented in Chinese civilization was spread to Korean civilization in era of Three Kingdoms, and continued to era of Unified Silla.

The system got consolidated in age of Goryeo, as name of 'Taemyo' (Korean: 태묘; Hanja: 太廟). Goryeo accepted its ceremonial status equivalent to State of King in international diplomatic order driven by China, thus kept principle of 5 myo shrines (묘; 廟) under major principle of 'Son of Heaven worships 7 preceding ancestors' (天子七廟). Yet even though Goryeo accepted its ceremonial status equivalent to State of King under Chinese Emperor, it often tried to expand number of myo rooms from five to seven. Some of this subversive stroke against Yuan Empire was fueled by Anti-Yuan movement during the reign of King Gongmin.

The entire Confucian royal ancestral shrine system of Korea got fully redeveloped during Joseon dynasty in name of famous 'Jongmyo' (종묘; 宗廟), called 'Jongmyo system'. In early days of Joseon, since the country was founded and dominated by Confucian teachings, it sought implementing most authentic form of classic Confucian system on governance, and accepted every major principles from the Chinese Confucian royal ancestral shrine system. However, ironically, Joseon in later era had to seek its own unique architectural style and worshipping ceremony, since the Joseon dynasty have existed such a long time of almost 500 years, which is a way longer than any other Chinese dynasties. As Joseon had high value of Hyo (효; 孝), a mind of respecting parents and ancestors, Joseon officially declared that it was worshipping only five ancestors as State of King, yet actually detoured such principle and kept almost every spirit tablets of predecessors in shrine building for worship, by theoretically giving almost every predecessor a temple name as having same status of progenitor jo (조; 祖) or virtuous ancestor jong (종; 宗), which allows them to stay forever in the main shrine building as bulcheonjiju (불천지주; 不遷之主; lit. immovable presence). When Joseon was reestablished into the Korean Empire, redefining its status from 'State of King' to 'Empire of Emperor', it expanded official number of royal ancestor's myo from five to seven, yet the old practice of giving every predecessor an immovable presence was also continued.

The actual practice of the Confucian royal ancestral shrine in Joseon, awarding almost every former King an immovable status, rebuilt Jongmyo's main shrine building 'Jeongjeon' (정전) as form of having endless horizontal expansion, eventually creating a unique and iconic architectural style only found in Joseon. Also, the Jongmyo Jerye and the Jongmyo Jeryeak, a worshipping ritual and its music in Jongmyo, was also preserved even throughout the Colonial era. These integrated cultural system led the Jongmyo Shrine building to be designated as World heritage in 1995, and entailed ceremony protocols and music to be designated as Intangible cultural heritage in 2001.

=== Vietnam ===
Influence of the Confucian royal ancestral shrine is also found in Vietnamese civilization. One of the earliest records of operating Confucian royal ancestral shrine is found in a history book, Đại Việt sử ký toàn thư of Vietnam. In this book, records of Lý dynasty in 11th century, building a Confucian royal ancestral shrine named Thái miếu (太廟) near Imperial Citadel of Thăng Long are shown.

There are two remaining historic sites having system of the Confucian royal ancestral shrine in present Vietnam's Imperial City of Huế; 'Thái miếu' (太廟) and 'Thế Miếu' (世廟) of Nguyễn dynasty. These two shrine building complexes accepted one of major principle from Chinese system, 'Separate rooms within single building' (同堂異室). Meanwhile, as the Nguyễn dynasty defined itself as an independent empire, it constructed nine miếu (廟) rooms in Thái miếu. While the Thái miếu was shrine building for nine ancestors of the Nguyễn dynasty's first Emperor Gia Long, commemorated as Emperors posthumously, the 'Thế Miếu' was shrine building for Gia Long and his descendants.

=== Japan ===
Though there were several endeavors, Japanese civilization never had experienced nationwide influence from system of the Confucian royal ancestral shrine throughout the history. This history makes Japanese people in present-day use the word Sōbyō (宗廟) as simply referring to concept of just 'royal ancestral shrine', irrelevant of the strict Confucian protocols, only catching the facial denotation from kanji of it.

For example, in Jingiyrō (神祇令), a famous codebook of laws and protocols in 8th century Japan around Nara period, there is no statement on concept of the 'Confucian royal ancestral shrine' (宗廟), compared to Chinese Tang dynasty and Korean Silla dynasty in the same era. Also in 17th century Edo shogunate, Zhu Zhiyu, a Chinese Confucian scholar exiled to Japan after collapse of Ming dynasty, tried to transplant whole system of Chinese Confucian royal ancestral shrine to Kaga Domain yet left failed. Even in 18th century, Motoori Norinaga, a famous scholar of Kokugaku, wrote in Tamakatsuma (玉勝間) that traditional Japanese concept of Shinto shrine should be distinguished from Chinese concept of Confucian royal ancestral shrine, meaning two concepts should not be regarded as culturally compatible. This cultural difference of Japan from other parts of the East Asian cultural sphere stems from Japan's cultural preference on practice of venerating ancestors at Buddhist temple or indigenous mausoleum of Shinto shrine, over practice of worshipping ancestors at symbolic Confucian shrine where simply God-Ancestor's spirit tablet lies. Confucianism as political institution in Japan had weak position during the early ages of Japan, since the overall state governance was weak in that time. What filled relative vacancy of the Confucianism in Japan was its traditional religion, Shinto.

== See also ==
- Jongmyo
- Imperial Ancestral Temple
- Thế Miếu
- Temple name
- Ancestral shrine
- Sacrifice to Heaven
- Soil and grain
- Jesa
