= Myo =

Myo or MYO may refer to:

- Myo (Star Wars) is a character from Star Wars: Episode IV
- Myo-, a prefix used in biology to denote muscle, originating from the Greek derived μῦς, mys
- Myo shrine is a concept of shrine in Korean Confucian culture
- Maha Ne Myo (died 1825), Burmese general
- Maronite Youth Organization, national youth group for teenagers that go to a Maronite church in the United States

== See also ==
- Mayo (disambiguation), a word with a similar sound
