= Dongmyo =

Shrine in Seoul, South Korea

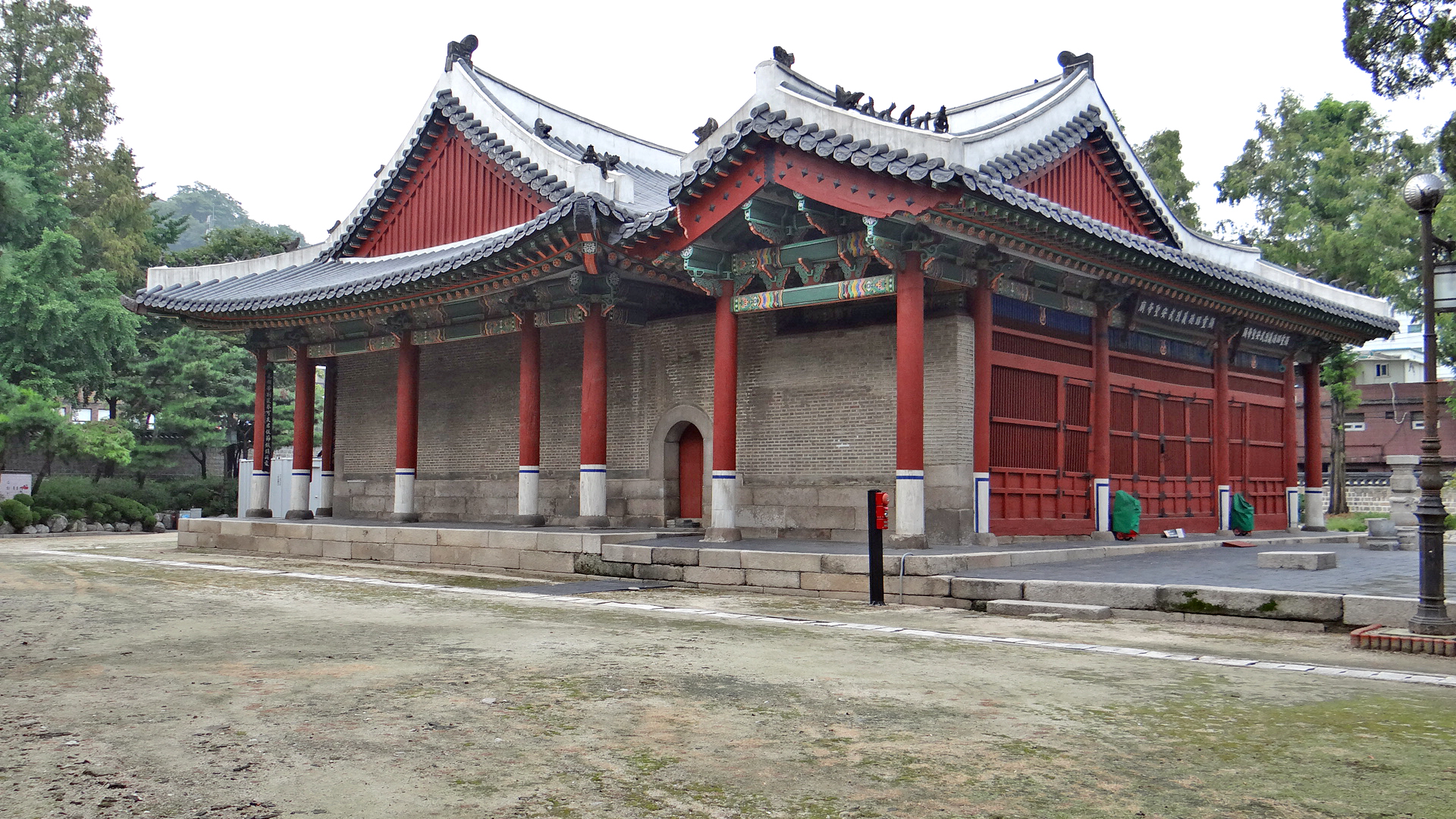
- Dongmyo Jeongjeon (Main Shrine Hall)

- Location in Seoul Location in South Korea

Location
- Location: Seoul, South Korea
- Interactive map of Dongmyo
- Coordinates: 37.5731°N 127.0182°E

Korean name
- Hangul: 동관왕묘
- Hanja: 東關王廟
- RR: Donggwanwangmyo
- MR: Tonggwanwangmyo

Dongmyo (Korean: 동묘; lit. 'Eastern Shrine') is a myo shrine in Downtown Seoul, South Korea. It was one of Guandi Temple built in honour of the 3rd century Chinese military commander, Guan Yu.

The Joseon government embarked on construction in 1599 and completed the work in 1601. The Wanli Emperor of Ming provided funds for construction of the shrine, along with a plaque with his own calligraphy. Three shrines - Dongmyo (east shrine), Seomyo (west shrine) and Bungmyo (north shrine) - were actually constructed in 1601. However, only Dongmyo Shrine remains today.

There was no such practice as worshipping Guan Yu as a Marshal Deity in Korea until Ming dynasty military officers brought the custom during the military campaigns against Japan. As Neo-Confucian fundamentalists, Korean officers found it unacceptable to worship Guan Yu, but were unable to refuse the Chinese request for enshrinement. The construction was a burden to exhausted postwar Korea and the shrine was maintained only with concern for the relationship with China.

Koreans remained indifferent toward these shrines for a long time. But during the reign of King Yeongjo (1724–1776), Dongmyo and Nammyo (another shrine constructed by Ming military official Zhen Yin) were incorporated into state rituals for the purpose of Ming worship linked with hostility toward and contempt for Manchu Qing dynasty.

The shrine is surrounded by a wall of stone and mud, and covers an area of 9,315 m^{2}. Ceremonies were held here for many years to thank Guan Yu for divine support. The shrine compound is enclosed on all sides by walls. Two figures to the rear of the compound are of the general while other figures are images of retainers and other generals. The figure with a red face is the general's earthly countenance and the one with a yellow face, his spirit.

The shrine, following the Chinese model, is narrower in width than depth, and the rear and side walls are sumptuously decorated with bricks. Inside the main shrine a wooden image of Guan Yu is enshrined, along with statues of four of his retainers.

A nearby station on Line 1 and Line 6 of the Seoul Subway is named after shrine. The shrine is located in Jongno District.

== Gallery ==
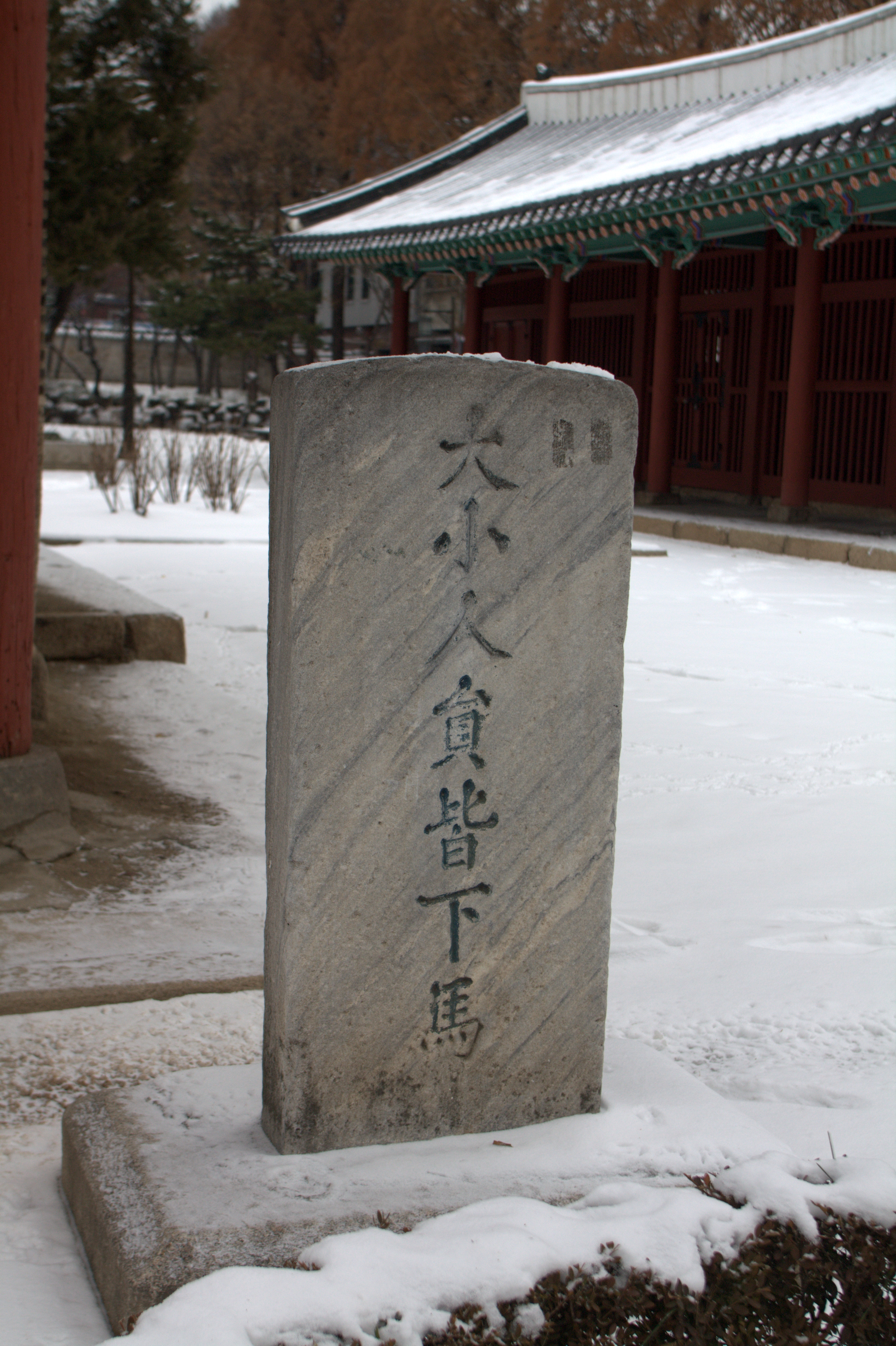

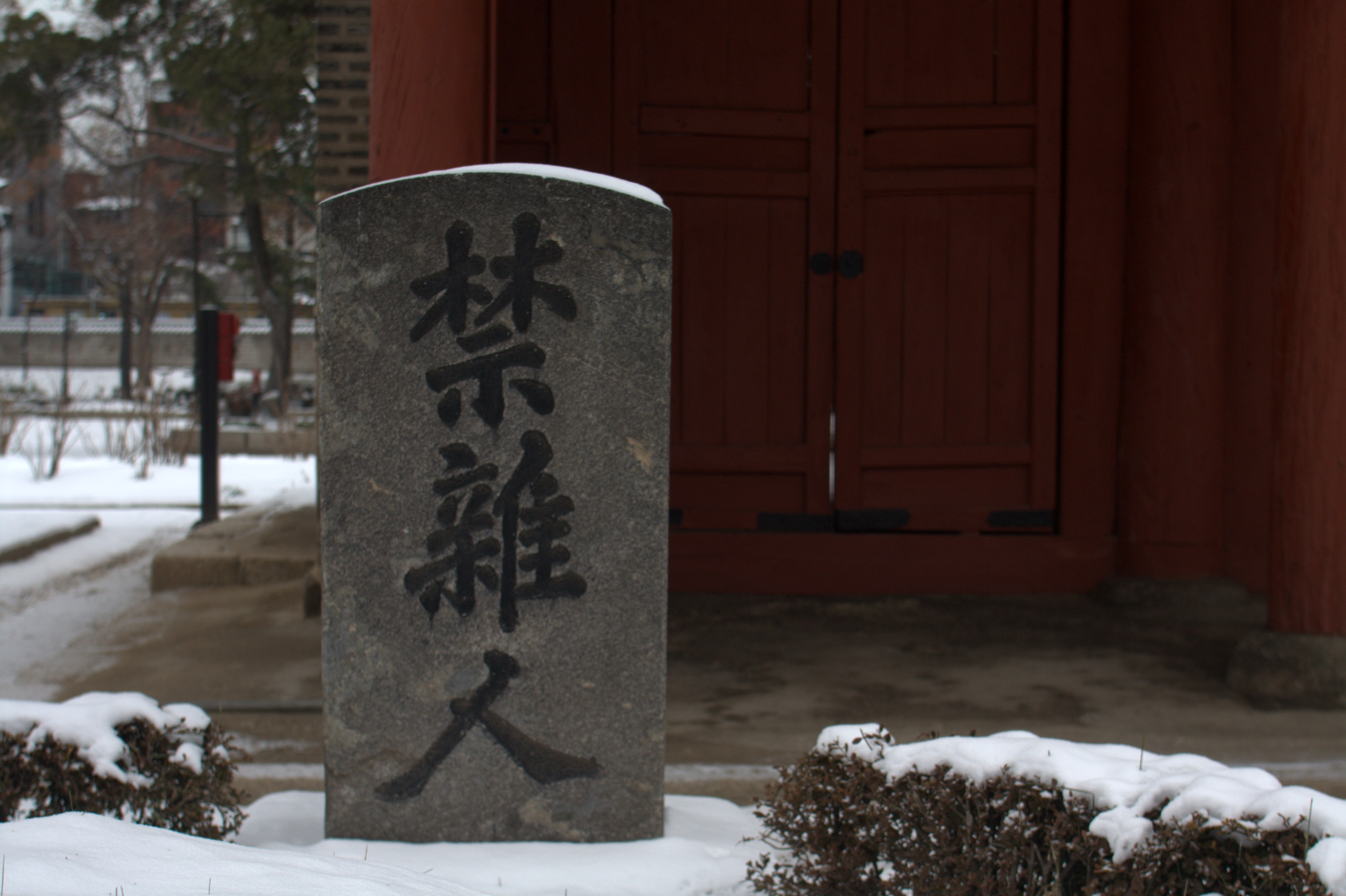

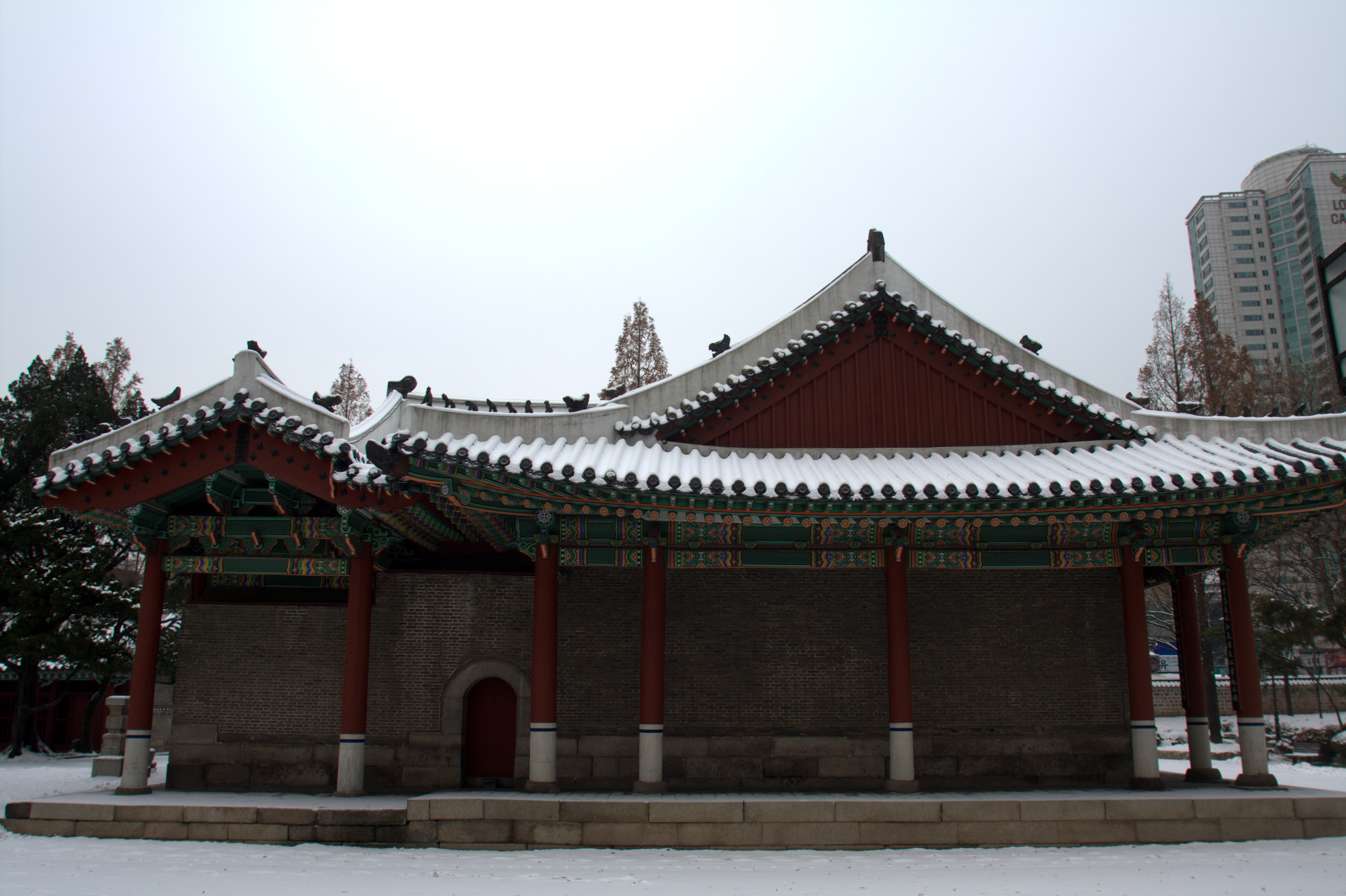

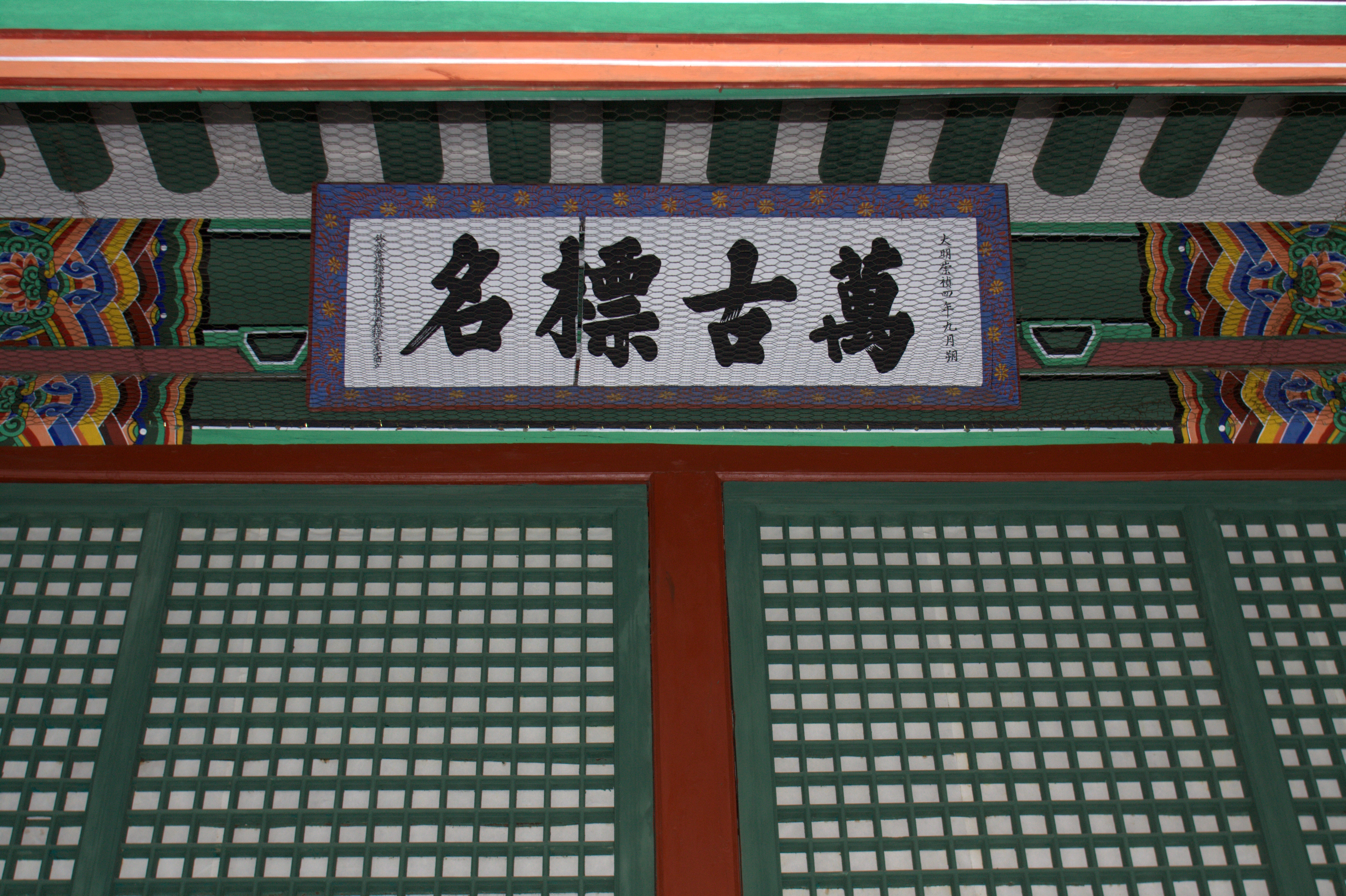

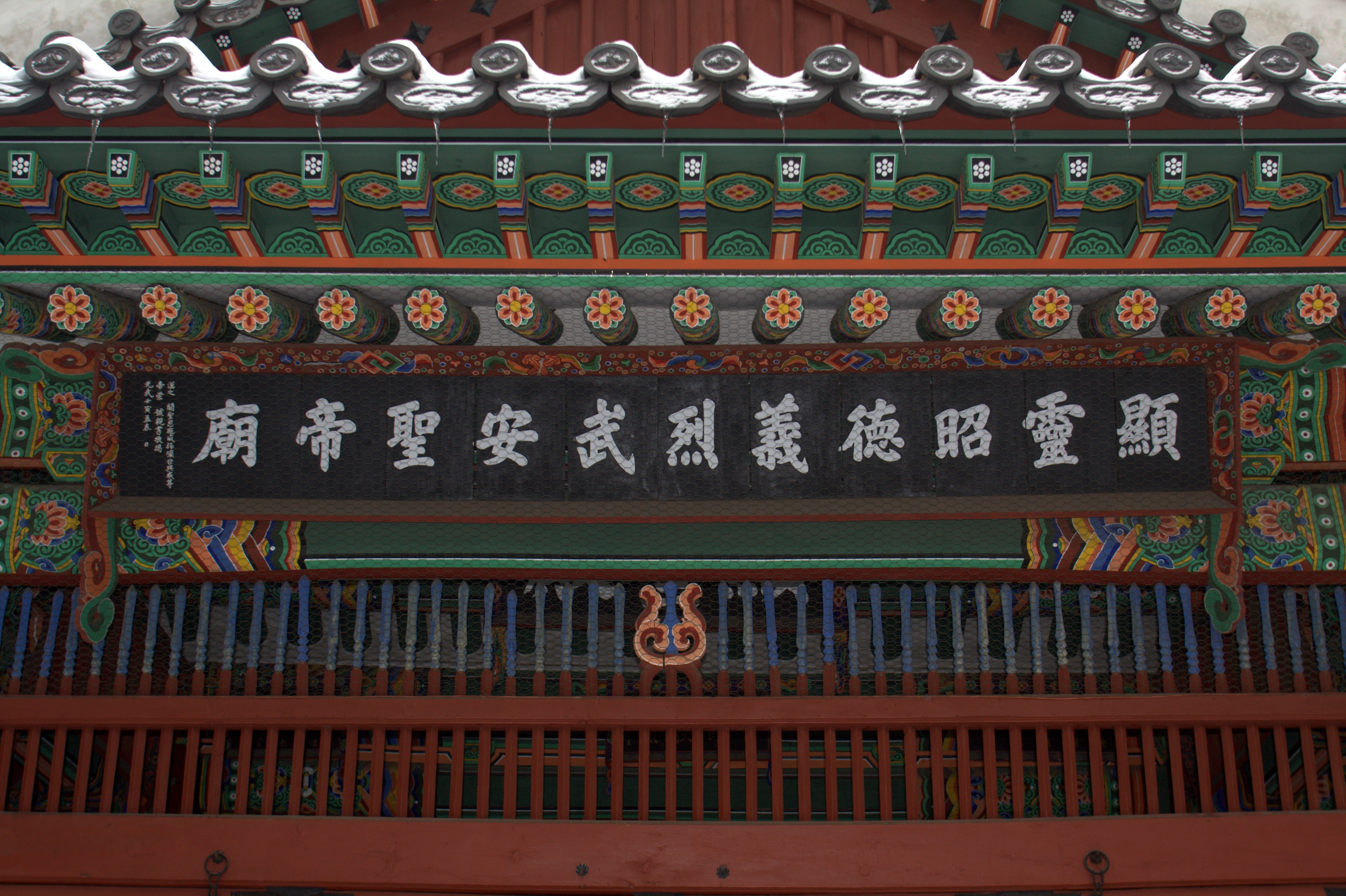

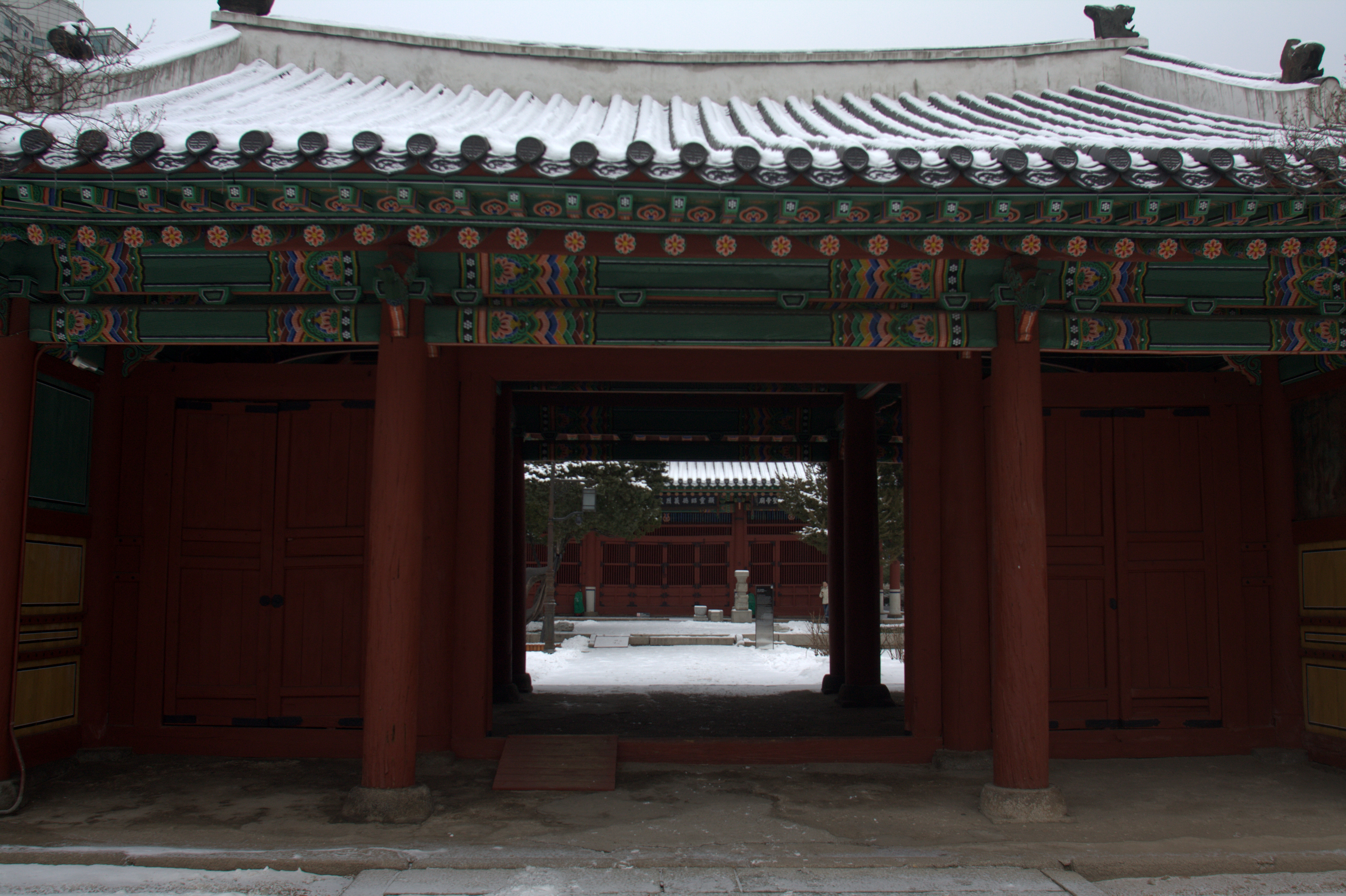

== See also ==
- History of Korea
- Korean architecture
