= Reibyō =

Reibyō (霊廟) is type of Japanese mausoleum. It may refer to:

== Places ==
- Taiyū-in Reibyō in Nikkō, Tochigi, Japan
- Taitoku-in Reibyō in Minato, Tokyo, Japan

== Other uses ==
- Mitamaya, a Japanese concept of tomb

== See also ==
- 廟 (disambiguation)
- List of National Treasures of Japan shrines
