= Jongmyo jerye =

Ritual worship of Korean monarchs

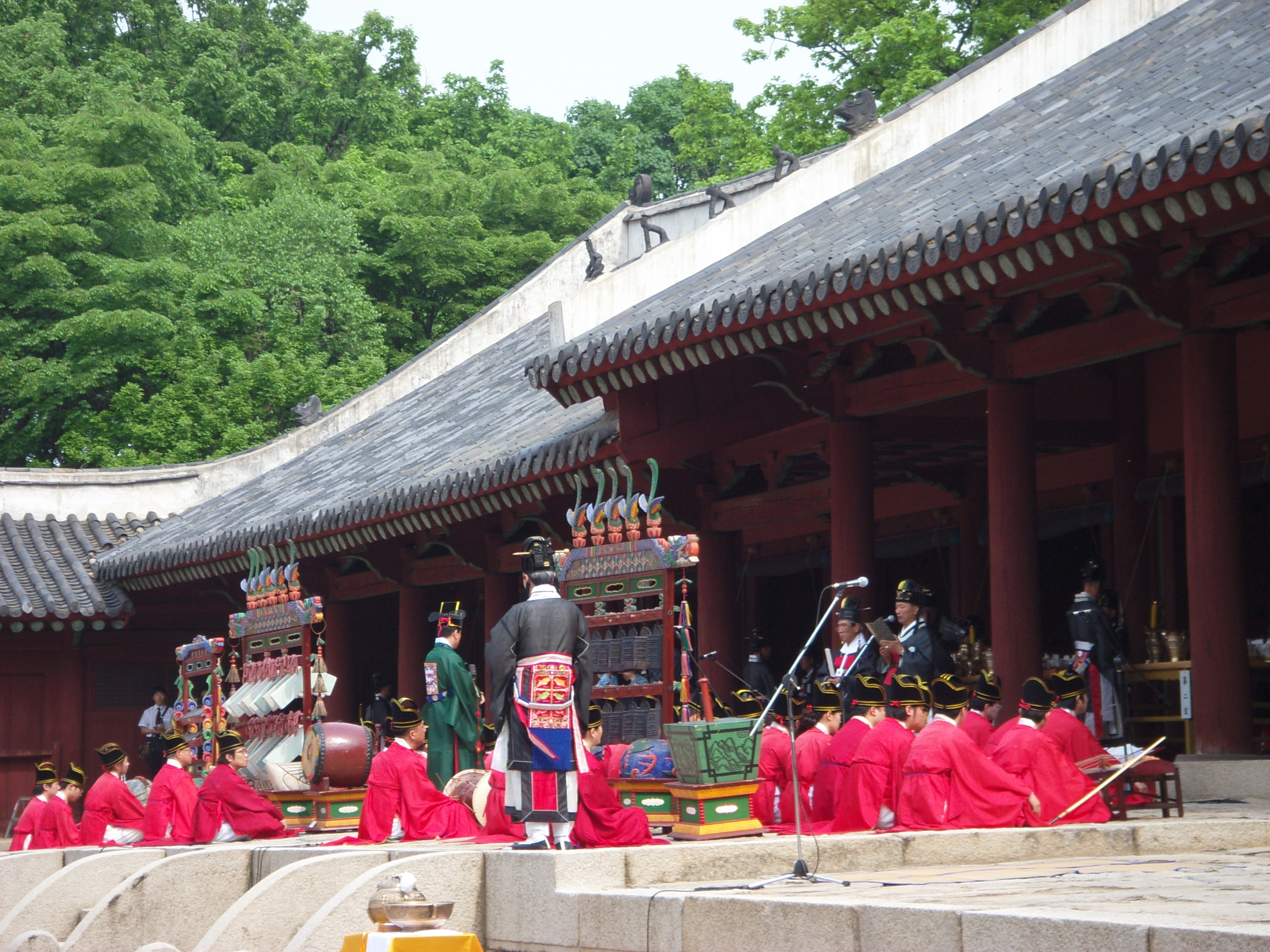
- Jongmyo jeryeak

Jongmyo jerye
- Hangul: 종묘제례
- Hanja: 宗廟祭禮
- RR: Jongmyo jerye
- MR: Chongmyo cherye

Alternate name
- Hangul: 종묘대제
- Hanja: 宗廟大祭
- RR: Jongmyo daeje
- MR: Chongmyo taeje

Jongmyo jerye (Korean: 종묘제례) or jongmyo daeje (종묘대제) is a traditional rite held for worshipping the deceased Joseon monarchs in Jongmyo Shrine, Seoul, South Korea. It is held every year on the first Sunday of May. The jongmyo rite is usually accompanied with the court music playing (Jerye-ak) and dance called Ilmu or line dance. Jongmyo jerye and jeryeak were designated as Masterpieces of the Oral and Intangible Heritage of Humanity by UNESCO in 2001.

== History ==
The ritual has its origins in the Confucian royal ancestral shrine system practiced in premodern China and Korea. It is meant to pay tribute to ancestors and the gods, and was seen as one of the most important rituals and duties for the monarchy.

At the latest, the ritual was well in place during the era of the three kingdoms of Korea, especially during the Goguryeo Dynasty. The ritual was then preserved over Silla era to the last Korean Dynasty of Joseon. The Jongmyo ritual, together with the Soil and Grain ritual at Sajikdan, are traditionally Korea's two most important imperial rituals. These practices have been lost in China due to the abolition of the monarchy, but the traditions are still preserved in South Korea even after the fall of the last monarchic Joseon dynasty.

The current ceremonies are organised and performed by the descendants of the former imperial family, the Jeonju Lee Royal Family Association, with assistance from other cultural organisations. The presiding officer (choheongwan 初獻官) is the most senior member of the imperial family, currently Yi Won who holds the title of Hereditary Prince Imperial (hwangsason 皇嗣孫), succeeding Yi Gu who held the title Prince (hwangseson 皇世孫, lit. "imperial grandson"). During the Joseon dynasty and even during the Japanese occupation period, the chief officiant was the Emperor of Korea.

== Procedures ==
The Jerye procedures were divided into three parts. It is regarded as Korea's highest-ranked ritual, so it was held strictly and solemnly. The first part is the procedures to invite and greet the spirits. The first part's procedures are jagye (purification). Chwiwi (就位) describes the part where the officiants, after performing ablutions, take their proper places for the rites to follow.

The second is rituals for entertaining the spirits. This segment begins with the rites of Jinchan (進饌), in which 63 kinds of foods to the spirits are offered to be placed to the altars. Then three wine offerings are made, the first called Choheonrye (初獻禮), the second Aheonrye (亞獻禮) and the third Jongheonrye (終獻禮), done by the three most senior officiants present respectively. These offerings are made as other officiants recite prayers asking the spirits of heaven and earth for their blessing. The presiding officer ceremonially tastes the offerings in the Eumbok (飮福) phase, representing a communal meal held by the president and the spirits. The Cheonbyeondu (撤籩豆) is the rite of removing all the foods served for the spirits (in practice the table is not cleared, and the items merely symbolically moved).

The third part is the last rites which are held to send off the spirits to heaven. In Songsin (送神), the choheongwan and other officiants bow four times to send off the spirits to heaven. Mangryo (望燎) is the last rite, in which the prayer papers used are burned. After the choheongwan receives confirmation that the rituals and services have been completed, all the officiants leave the grounds.

The words of the rite are spoken using the Korean pronunciation of Classical Chinese, and not in modern Korean.

In each of the bows made during the ceremony, those of the official party bow first followed by those watching the ceremony in person, who bow in reverence at the signal of the master of ceremonies.

== Jerye-ak ==
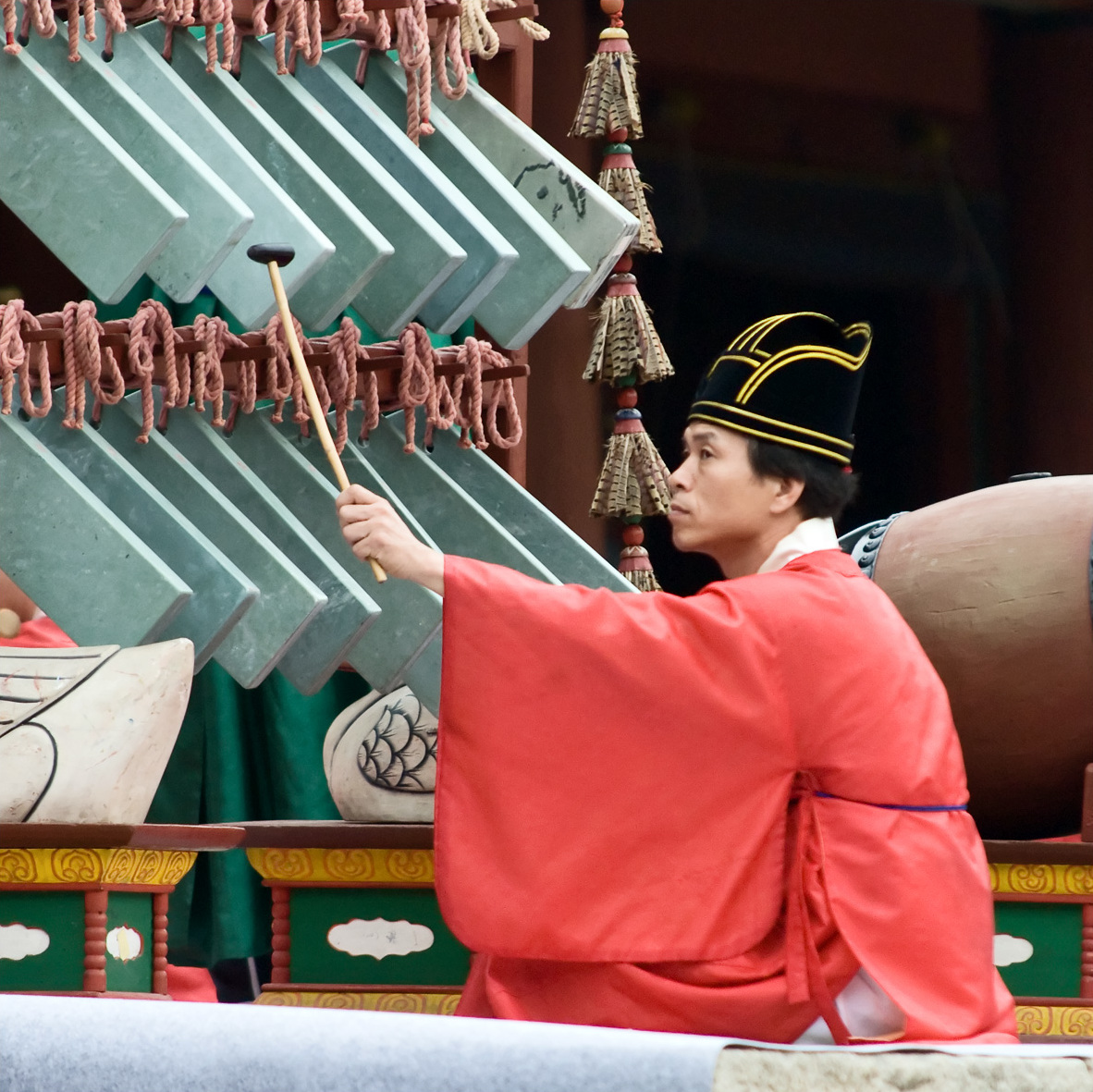
Pyeongyeong

Jongmyo jerye rituals were held together with a large instrumental and vocal ensemble performing ritual music called Jongmyo jerye-ak (종묘제례악; 宗廟祭禮樂), which was believed to bring enjoyment to the spirits invited to join the rites. The pieces played in the rites were Botaepyeong (보태평; 保太平) and Jeongdaeeop (정대업; 定大業). There were also songs that accompanied the jerye-ak, named Jongmyo Akjang (종묘악장; 宗廟樂章).

An elaborate performance of ancient court music (with accompanying dance) known as Jongmyo jeryeak (종묘제례악; 宗廟祭禮樂) is performed there each year. Musicians, dancers, and scholars would perform Confucian rituals, such as the Jongmyo Daeje (Royal Shrine Ritual) in the courtyard five times a year. Today the rituals have been reconstructed and revived. The Jongmyo Daeje has been designated as Important Intangible Cultural Property No. 56 and is performed every year in May. The Jongmyo Jerye-ak, the traditional court music of Joseon, is performed by the Jeongakdan of the National Gugak Center (國立國樂院 正樂團) and has been designated as Important Intangible Cultural Property No. 1. This court music has its origins in Chinese yayue court music that was brought to Korea during the Goryeo period. King Sejong composed new music for the ritual based largely on hyangak (with some dangak) in 1447 and 1462. The National Gugak Center is itself the direct successor to the Yi Household Music Department (舊王宮雅樂部).

== Dances ==
The jerye's dance is called ilmu (일무; 佾舞; lit. 'line dance'). Ilmu divided into botaepyeongji-mu (dance to praise achievements of the former kings), and jeongdaeeopji-mu, (dance to praise the king's military achievements). Ilmu dances are performed by a group of 64 women dancers wearing purpled-clothing dance. They called palilmu (팔일무; 八佾舞; lit. 'eight line dance') because they dance in 8 lines and rows.

Ilmu divided into two types of dance, munmu (문무; 文舞; lit. 'civil dance') and mumu (무무; 武舞; lit. 'martial dance'). Munmu is accompanied by botaepyeongji-ak. A yak (flute) is held in the left hand and jeok (a pheasant-feather tasseled wooden bar) in the right hand. For mumu, dancers move quickly by holding wooden swords and the rear four rows wooden spears in the front four rows.

== Gallery ==
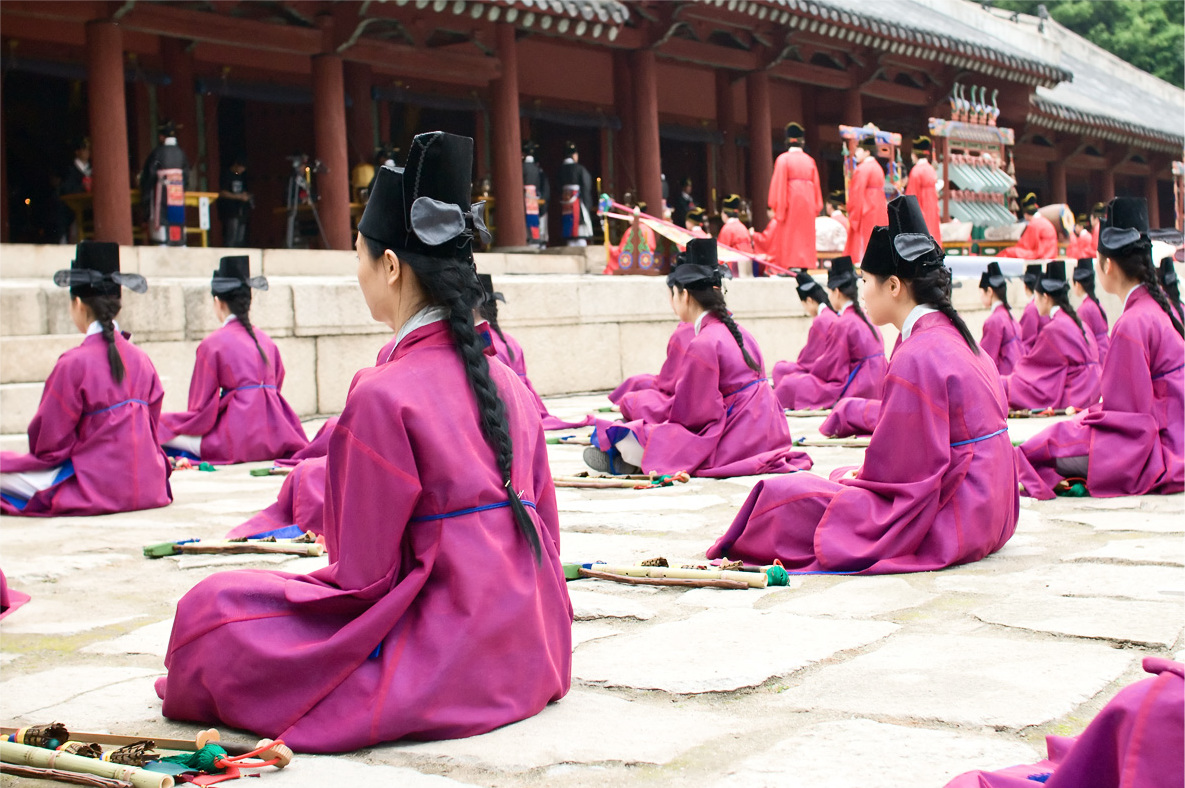

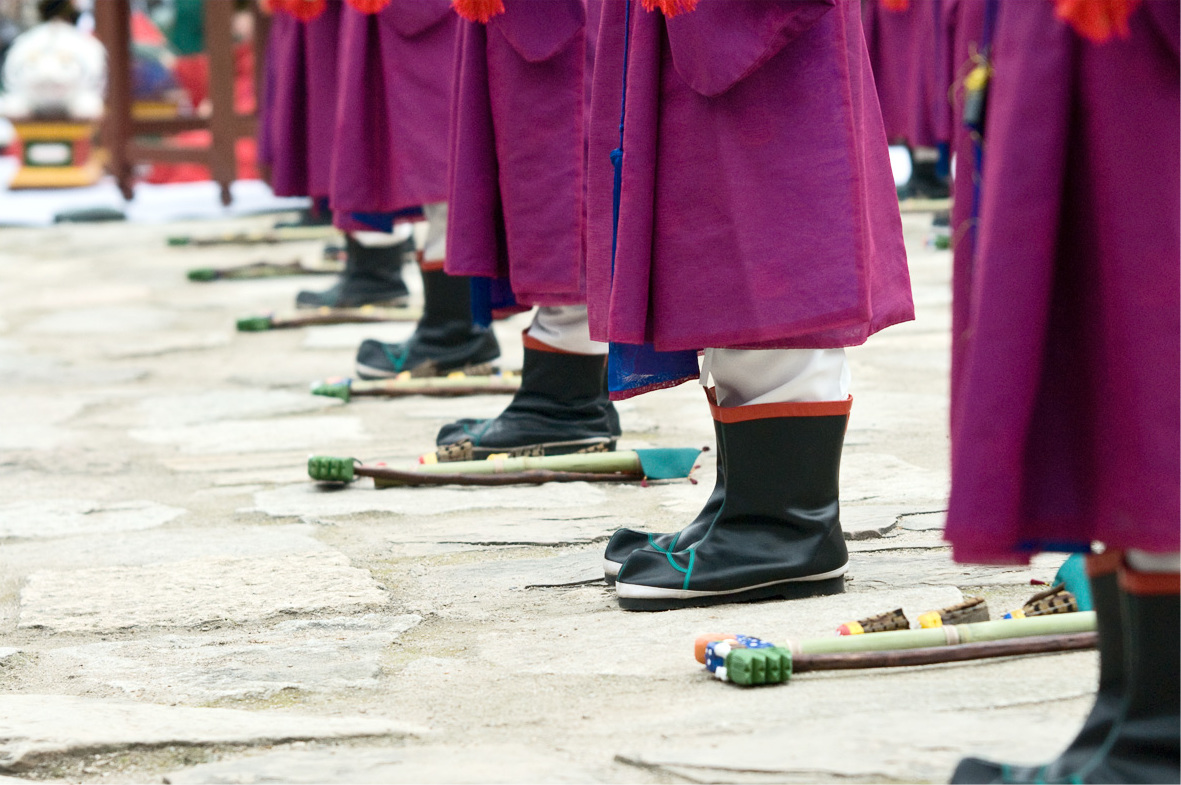

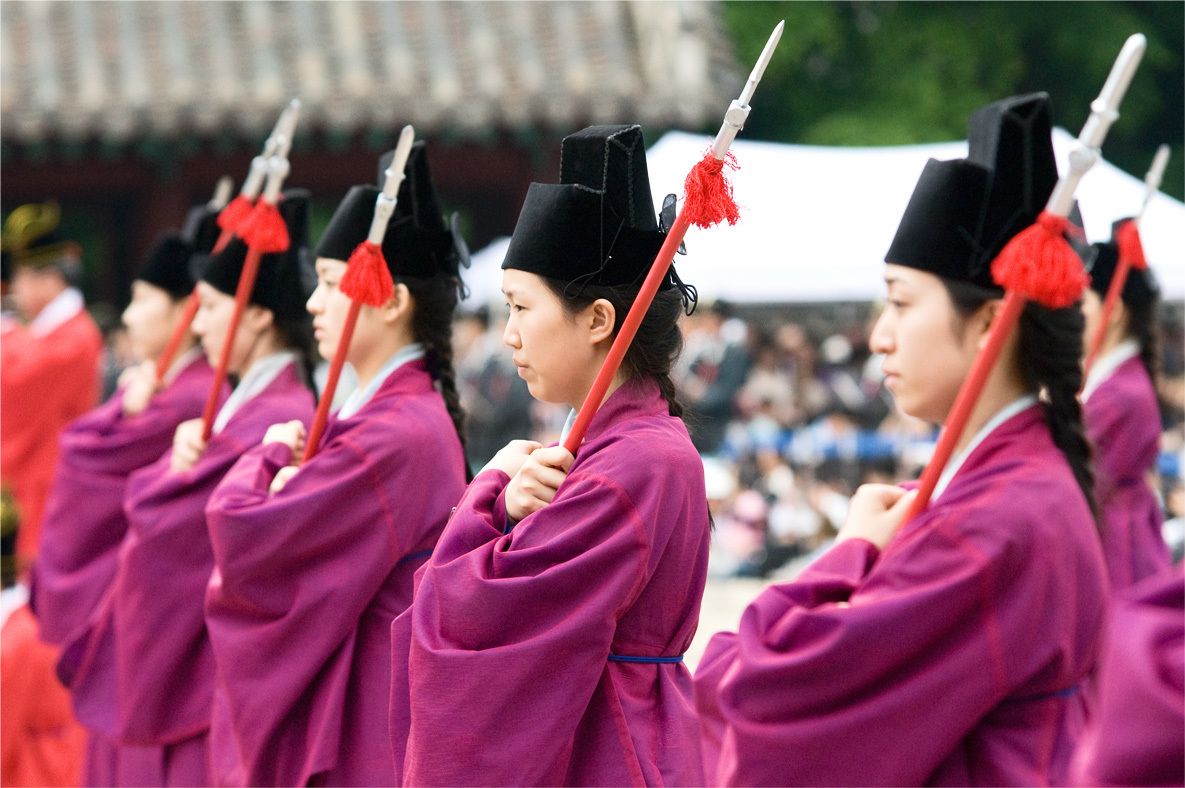

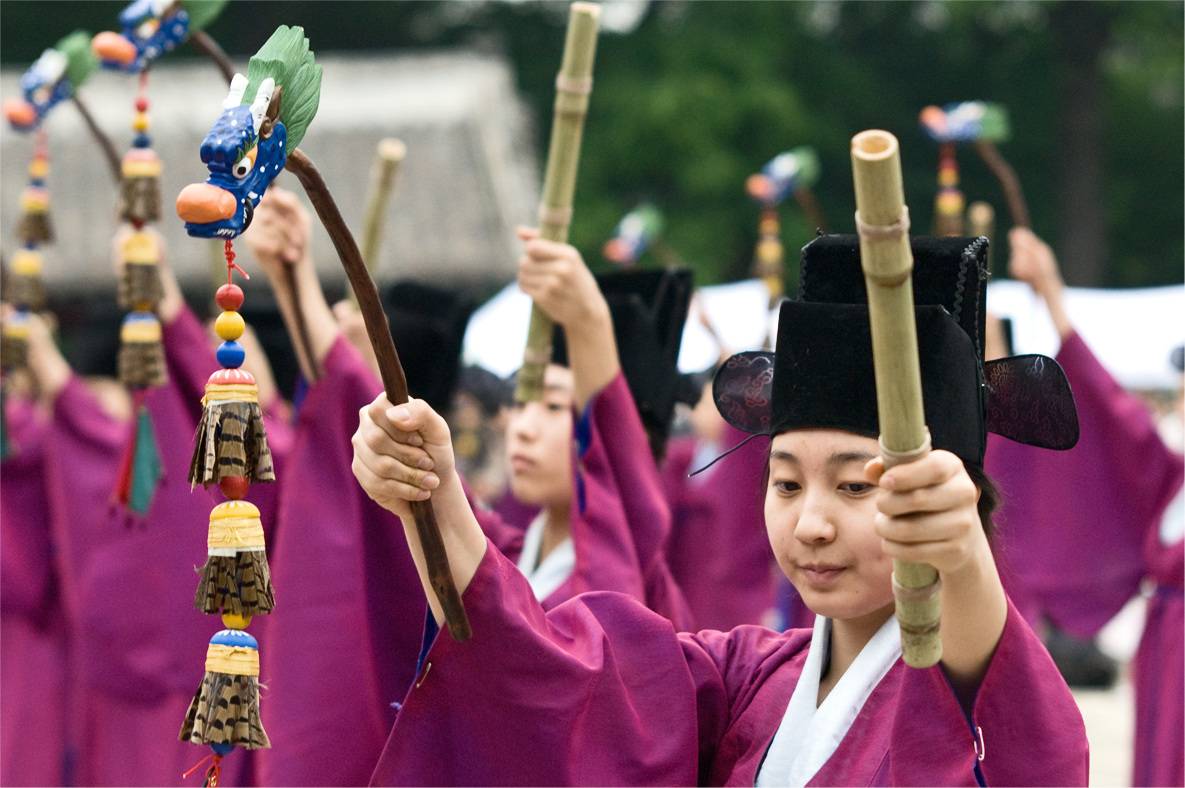
