= Imperial Ancestral Temple =

Building in Beijing, China

Coordinates: 39°54′35.87″N 116°23′36.75″E

- 太廟
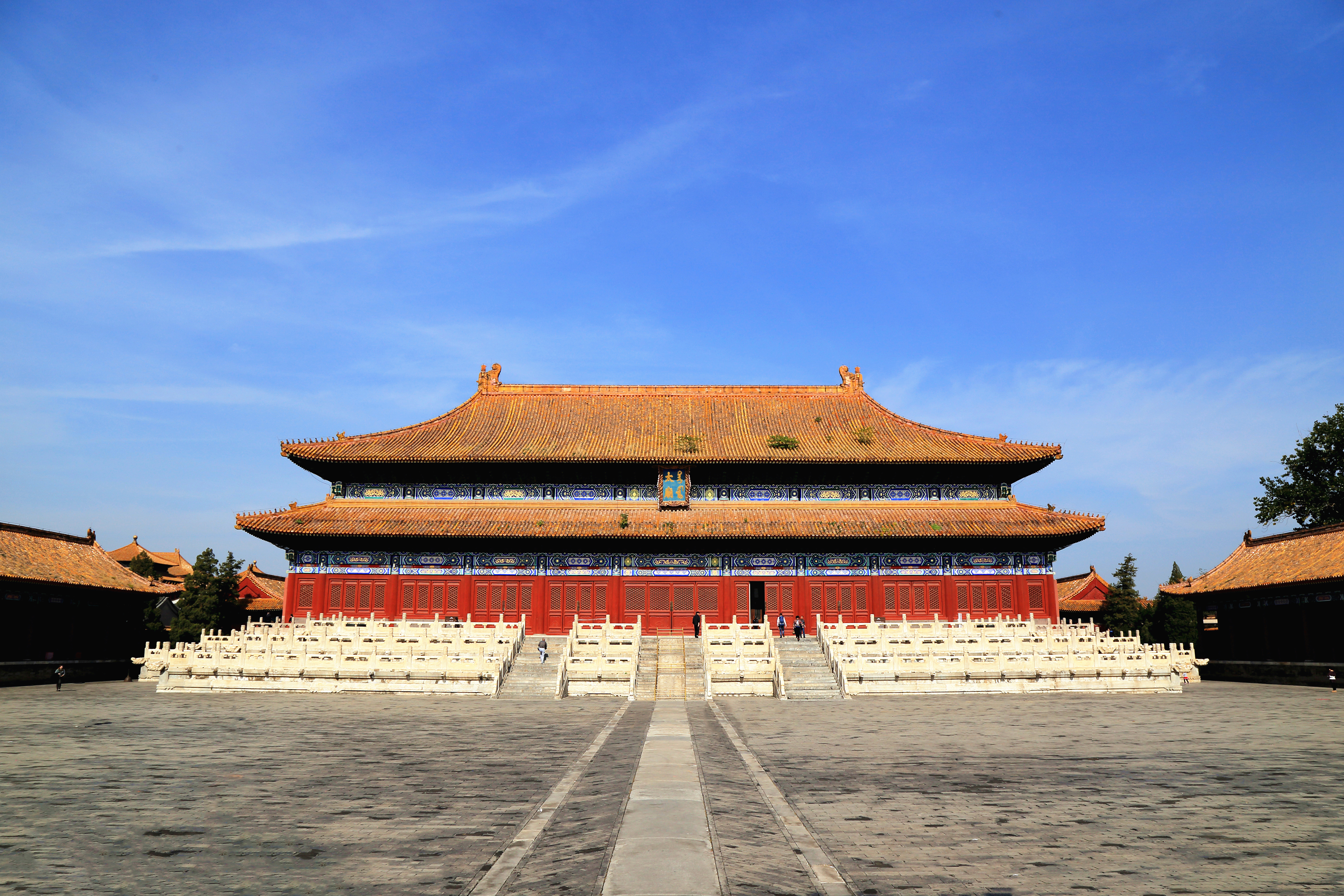
- The Hall for Worship of Ancestors
- Interactive map of the Imperial Ancestral Temple area

General information
- Location: Imperial City
- Estimated completion: 1420 (18th year of Yongle Emperor)

The Imperial Ancestral Temple, or Taimiao (simplified Chinese: 太庙; traditional Chinese: 太廟; pinyin: Tàimiào) of Beijing, is a historic site in the Imperial City, just outside the Forbidden City, where during both the Ming and Qing dynasties, sacrificial ceremonies were held on the most important festival occasions in honor of the imperial family's ancestors.

The temple, which resembles the Forbidden City's ground plan, is a cluster of buildings in three large courtyards separated by walls. The main hall inside the temple is the Hall for Worship of Ancestors, which is one of only four buildings in Beijing to stand on a three-tiered platform, a hint that it was the most sacred site in imperial Beijing. It contains seats and beds for the tablets of emperors and empresses, as well as incense burners and offerings. On the occasion of large-scale ceremonies for worship of ancestors, the emperors would come here to participate.

Flanking the courtyard in front of this hall are two long, narrow buildings. These were worship halls for various princes and courtiers. The Western Wing housed the spirit tablets of meritorious courtiers, while the Eastern Wing enshrined various princes of the Ming or Qing dynasty.

Behind the Hall for Worship of Ancestors are two other main halls. The first was built in 1420 and used to store imperial spirit tablets.

By the 1920s, the Imperial Ancestral Temple and its surrounding spaces had become a public park, and that public park today has been expanded from its original size and is now also known as the Working People's Cultural Palace (劳动人民文化宫; pinyin: Láodòng Rénmín Wénhuà Gōng). This park was extended based on the Imperial Ancestral Hall site, and the park is located east of Tiananmen, while the Zhongshan Park lies to the west. These two parks along with Beihai Park and Jingshan and several other parks have a deep historic tie with the Forbidden City.

The temple platform was used in 1998 to stage performances of the opera Turandot. This was recorded and broadcast as Turandot at the Forbidden City.

== Images ==
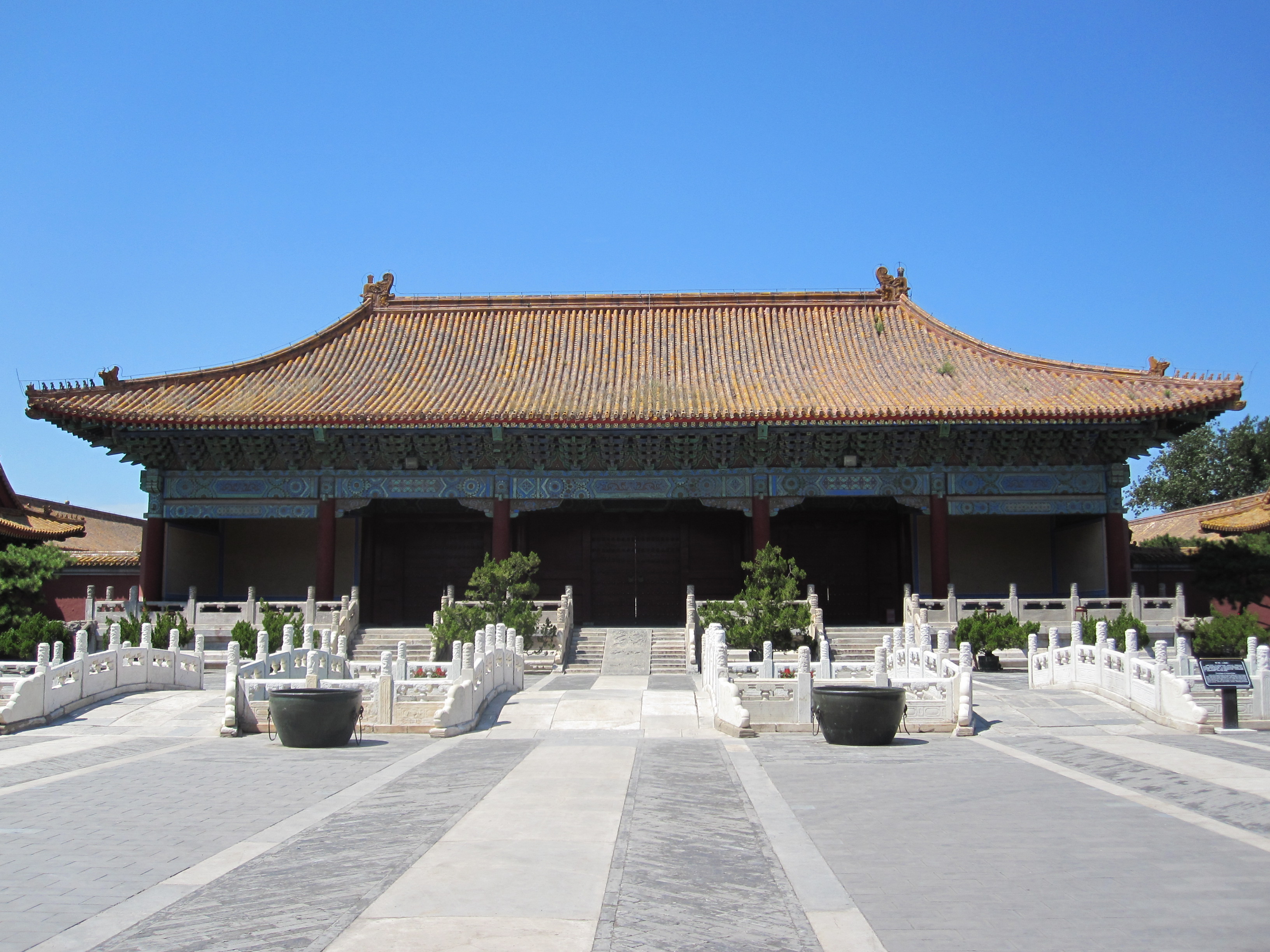
The Halberd Gate

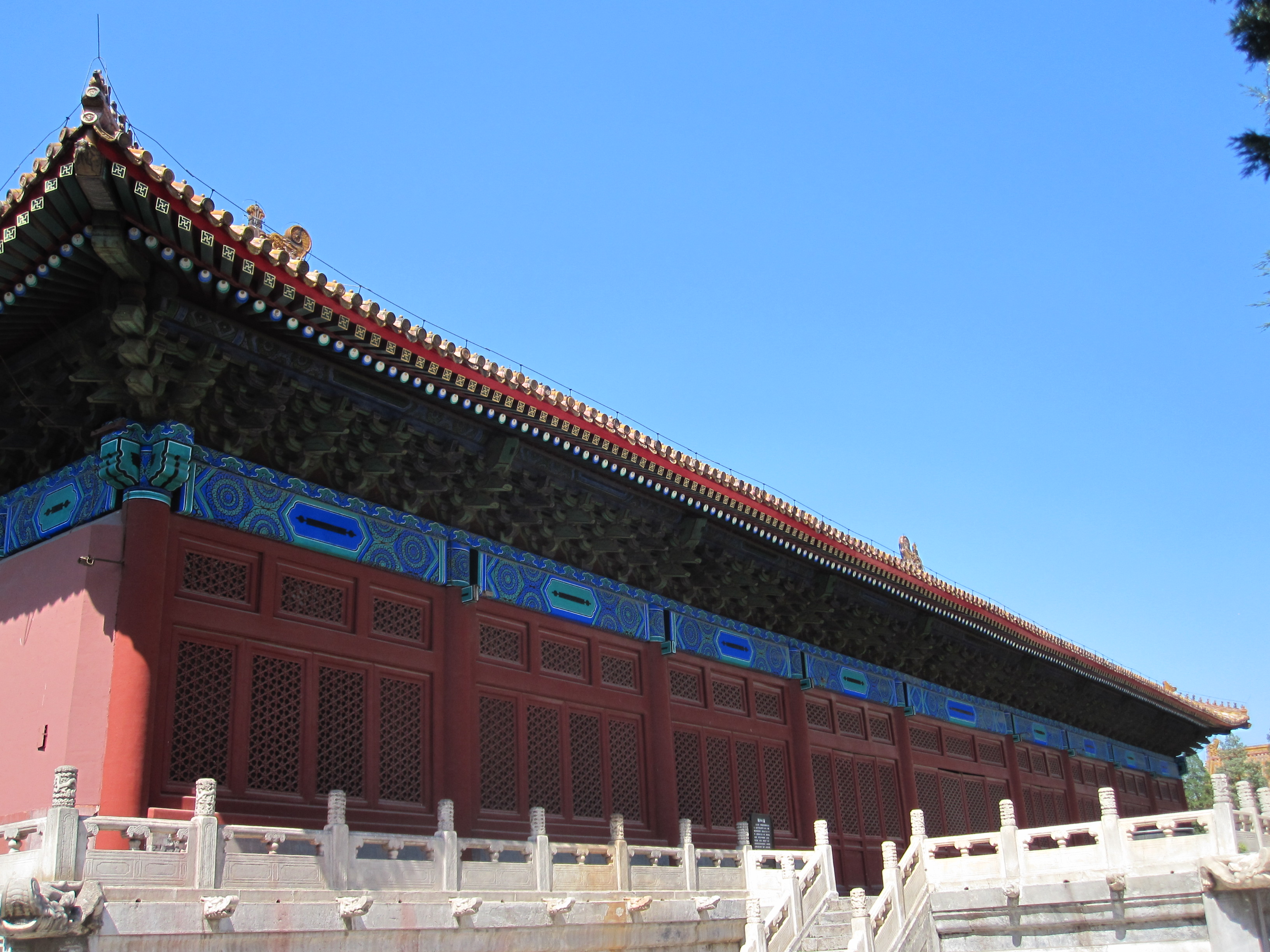
The Ancestral Shrine (a.k.a. Back Hall)

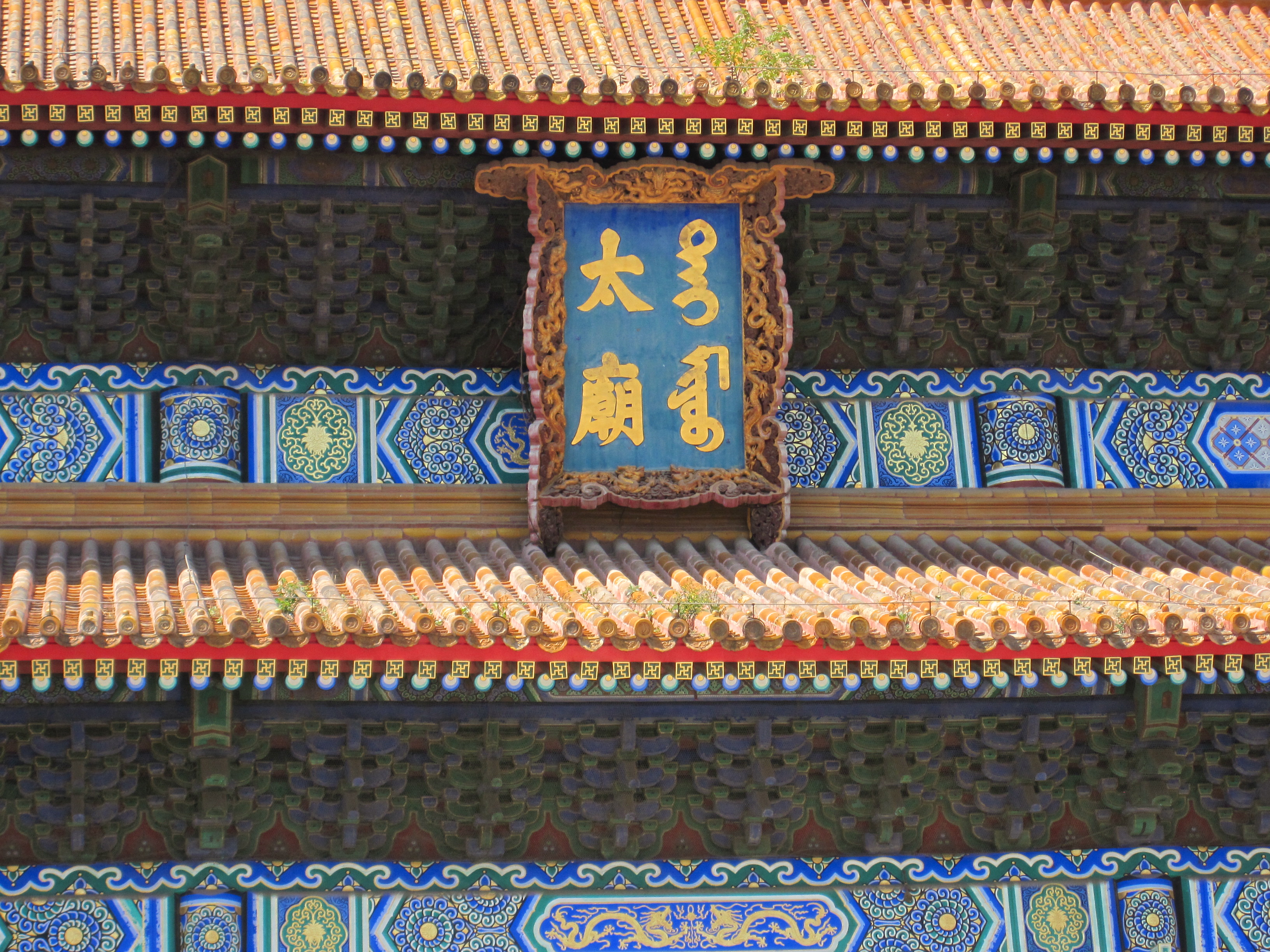
Name plaque. The left column is in Chinese, the right column in Manchu.

== See also ==
- Nine Altars and Eight Temples
- Imperial City, Beijing
- Jongmyo (Seoul)
- Ise Grand Shrine
- Thế Miếu, Huế
- Triệu Tổ miếu, Huế
