= Thế Miếu =

Historical place of worship in Huế, Vietnam

Coordinates: 16.4672°N 107.5768°E

- Thế Miếu 世廟 (Vietnamese)
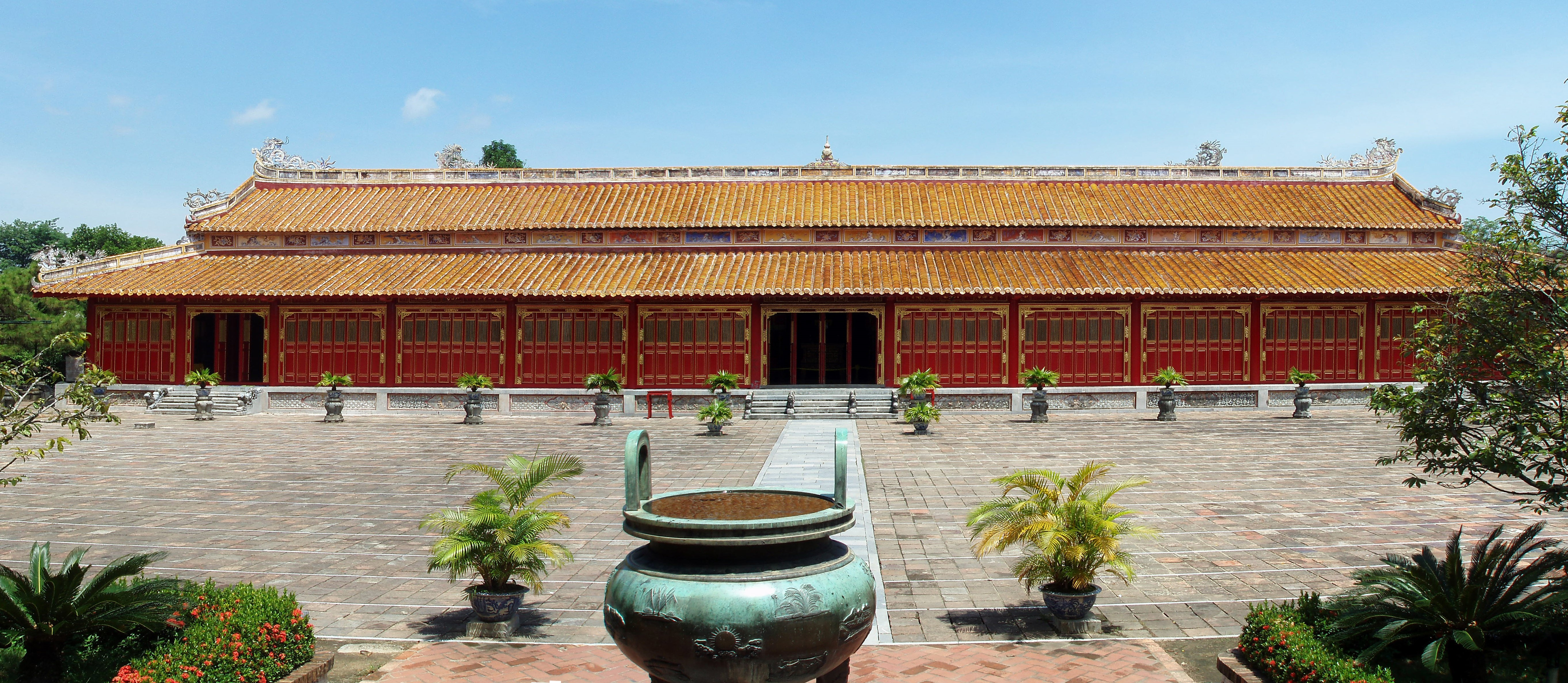
- Thế Miếu Temple in the Imperial City, Huế

- Location within Vietnam
- Type: Confucian royal ancestral shrine
- Location: Phú Xuân district, Huế, Vietnam

History
- Built: 1821

Site notes
- Owner: Government of Vietnam

- Thế Miếu
- Vietnamese alphabet: Thế Miếu; Thế Tổ Miếu
- Chữ Hán: 世廟 世祖廟

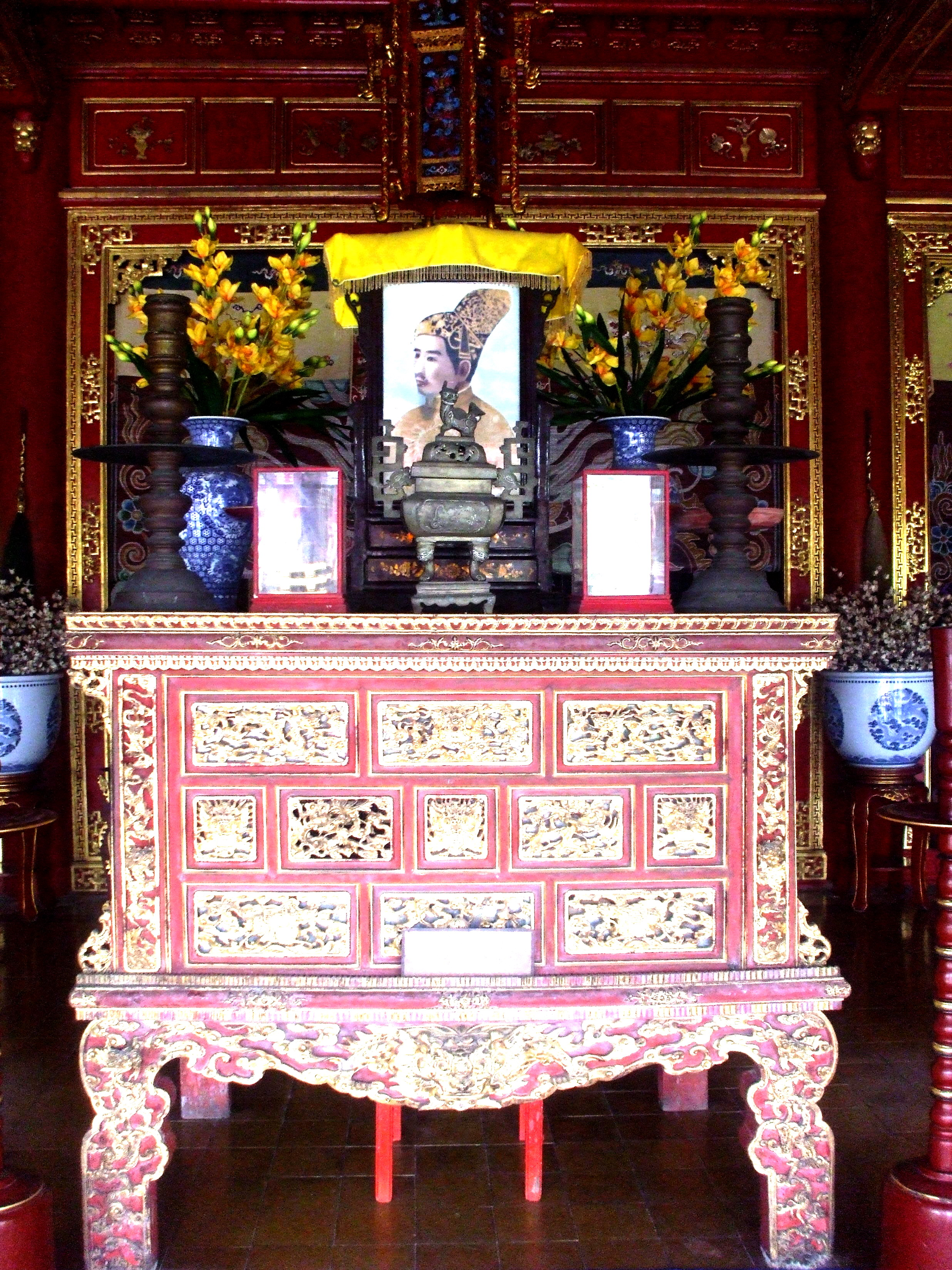
Altar to Emperor Gia Long

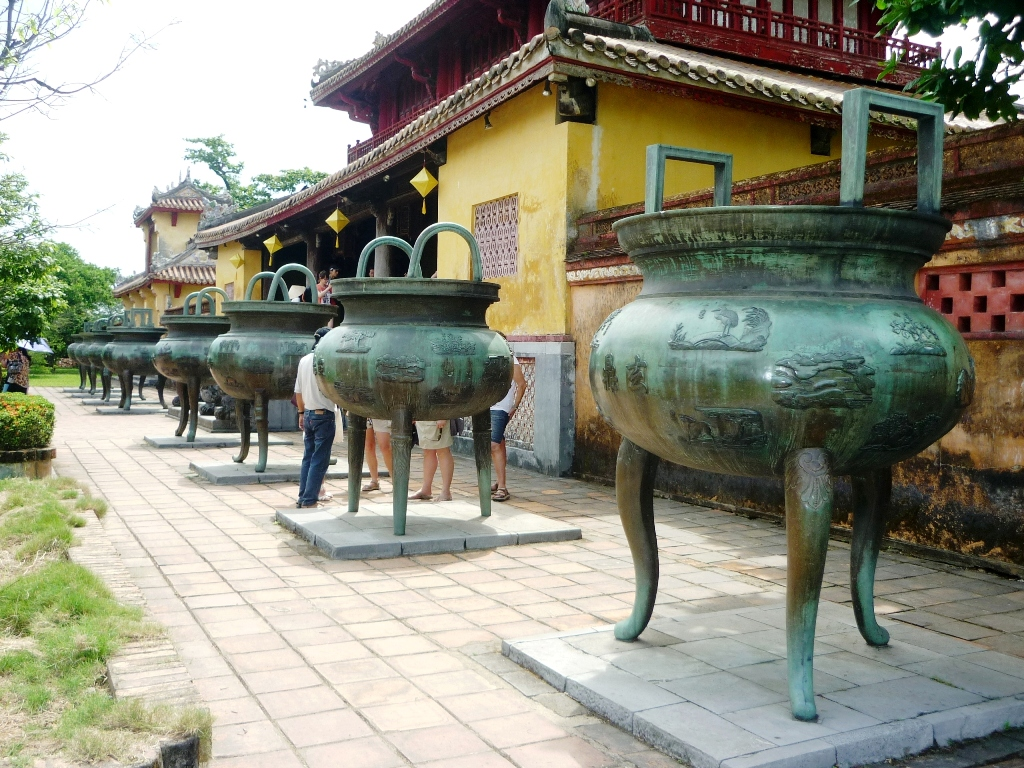
Nine dynastic urns dedicated to nine emperors

Thế Miếu (chữ Hán: 世廟), also called Thế Tổ Miếu (chữ Hán: 世祖廟), is a Confucian royal ancestral shrine to Vietnam's emperors in the Imperial City of Huế.

== History ==
It was constructed at the orders of emperor Minh Mạng in 1822–1823 for the purposes of ancestor worship of the past emperors of the Nguyễn dynasty. Nine dynastic urns (cửu đỉnh 九鼎) opposite of the Thế Miếu were also cast in 1822 and dedicated to the first nine Nguyen emperors. These urns are similar to the legendary Nine Tripod Cauldrons (Chinese jiǔdǐng 九鼎) of China's Xia, Shang and Zhou Dynasties.

Another temple nearby is the Triệu Tổ miếu.

== See also ==
- Taimiao, Beijing
- Jongmyo, Seoul
