= Jongmyo =

Confucian shrine in Seoul, South Korea

Jongmyo Shrine
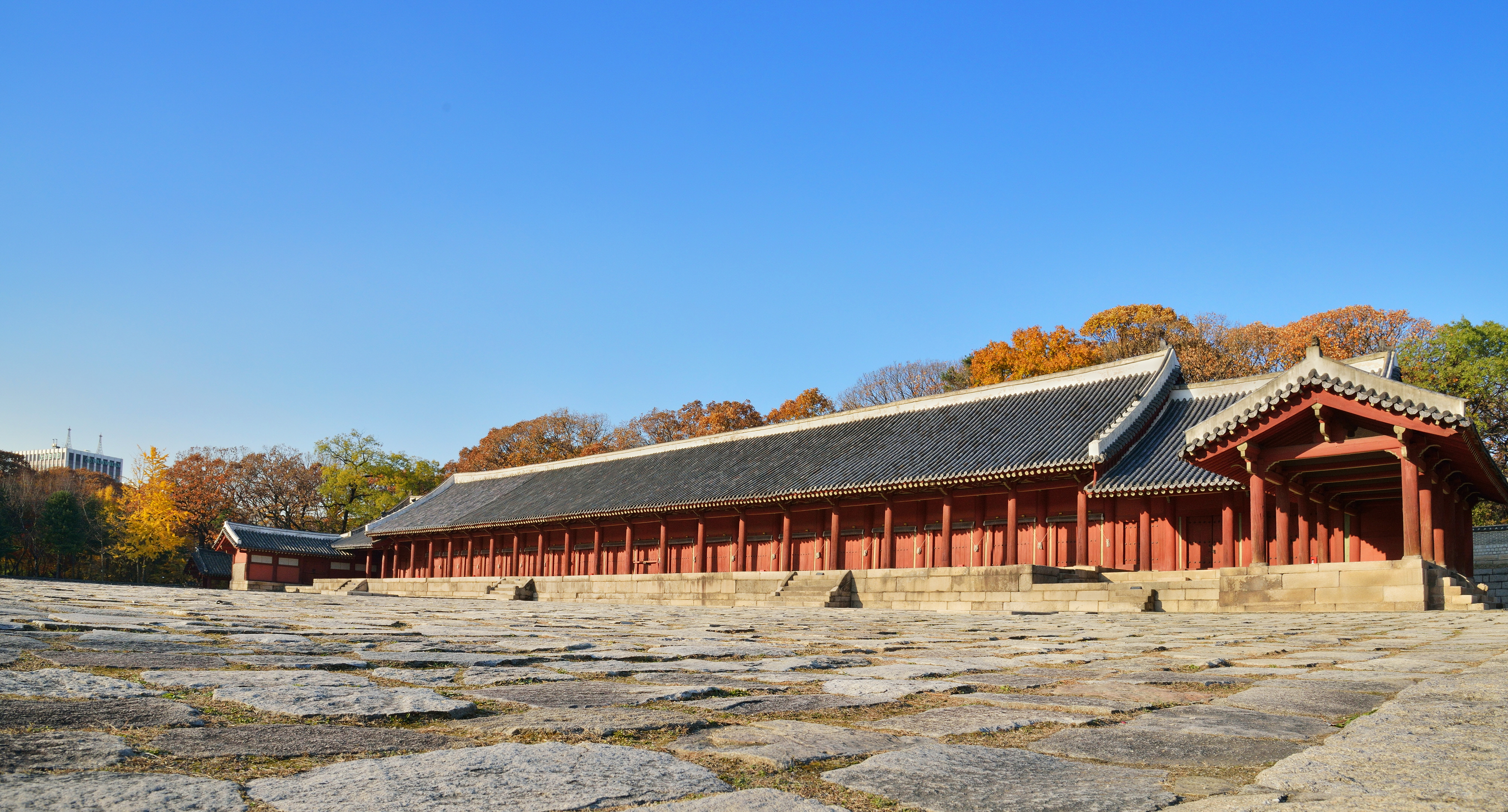
- Jeongjeon of Jongmyo Shrine, prior to its restoration in 2020
- Interactive map of Jongmyo Shrine
- 37°34′29″N 126°59′37″E
- Type: Confucian royal ancestral shrine
- Location: 157 Jongno, Jongno District, Seoul, South Korea

History
- Built: From 1394

Site notes
- Area: 200,545 m^{2}
- Governing body: Jongmyo Management Office, Cultural Heritage Administration
- Owner: Government of South Korea
- Website: english.cha.go.kr

UNESCO World Heritage Site
- Official name: Jongmyo Shrine
- Type: Cultural
- Criteria: iv
- Designated: 1995 (19th session)
- Reference no.: 738
- Region: East Asia

Historic Sites of South Korea
- Official name: Jongmyo Shrine
- Designated: 1963-01-18
- Reference no.: Abolished

Korean name
- Hangul: 종묘
- Hanja: 宗廟
- RR: Jongmyo
- MR: Chongmyo

Jongmyo (Korean: 종묘) is a Confucian royal ancestral shrine in the Jongno District of Seoul, South Korea. It was originally built during the Joseon period (1392–1897) for memorial services for deceased kings and queens. According to UNESCO, the shrine is the oldest royal Confucian shrine preserved and the ritual ceremonies continue a tradition established in the 14th century. Such shrines existed during the Three Kingdoms of Korea period (57–668), but these have not survived. The Jongmyo Shrine was added to the UNESCO World Heritage list in 1995.

Changdeokgung and Changgyeonggung lie to the north of Jongmyo. Yulgok-ro separated Jongmyo from the palaces from 1932 to 2019, until Yulgok-ro was turned into a road tunnel and the connection between Jongmyo and the palaces restored. The main buildings of Jongmyo were constructed in October 1394 when Taejo, founder and first king of Joseon, moved the capital to Hanseong (present-day Seoul). The shrine was destroyed by fire in the Japanese invasions of Korea (1592–1598), then rebuilt in early 1600s.

The shrine continues to be the venue for the Jongmyo Daejae ancestor-worship ceremony, where descendants of the imperial family honor the spirits of their deceased ancestors.

== History ==
When it was built in 1394 at the order of King Taejo, the Jongmyo Shrine was thought to be one of the longest buildings in Asia, if not the longest. The main hall, known as Jeongjeon (정전; 正殿), had seven niches or myoshil (묘실; 廟室; lit. 'Temple Room'), each reserved for the spirit tablets of a king and his queens. The complex was expanded by King Sejong (r. 1418–50) who ordered the construction of Yeongnyeongjeon (영녕전; 永寧殿; lit. 'Hall of Eternal Comfort'). This practice of expansion continued, with the growth of the complex moving from west to east, because of the need to house more memorial tablets during the reigns of later kings until there were a total of 19 myoshil. However, during the 1592–1598 Japanese invasions of Korea, Japanese invaders burned down the original shrine and a new complex was constructed in 1601 and has survived to this day. The original spirit tablets were saved in the invasion by hiding them in the house of a commoner.

A king's tablet was enshrined three years after his death, which is the end of the mourning period for a king. There are 19 tablets of kings and 30 of their queens, placed in the 19 niches. Each niche is very simple and plain in design. Only two kings' memorial tablets are not enshrined here. In addition to the tablet, there is a panel listing each king's accomplishments.

The two most recent enshrinements occurred in 1973 and 1991 in Yeongnyeongjeon Room 16, for Crown Prince Euimin and his wife Crown Princess Bangja, respectively.

The current Jeongjeon is National treasure and is the longest building in Korea of traditional design.

== Description ==
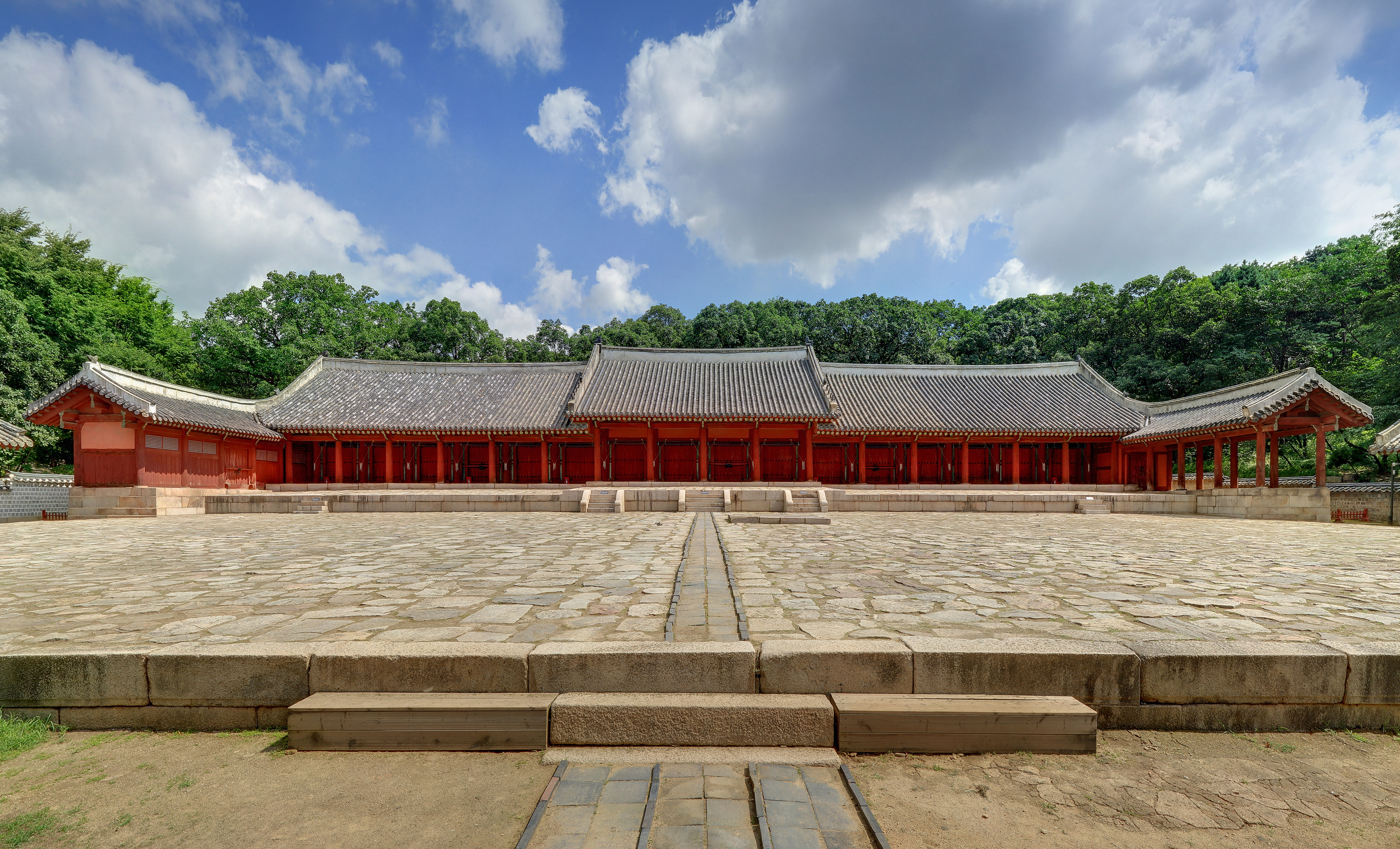
Yeongnyeongjeon

Viewed from the king's throne room at the royal palace Gyeongbokgung, Jongmyo Shrine would have been on the king's left while the Sajik Shrine, another important Confucian shrine, was on the right. This arrangement was derived from Chinese practice. Because Changdeokgung Palace was older than Gyeongbokgung Palace, Jongmyo was connected to Changdeokgung Palace, and the king entered and left through the north gate instead of the south gate. The main halls are surrounded by hills. The south entrance gate was reserved for spirits to enter and exit, the east gate was for the king, and the west gate was for the performers of the royal ritual.

The main building of the Jongmyo Shrine is divided into the Jeongjeon(정전/正殿) and the Yeongnyeongjeon(영녕전/永寧殿). The Yeongnyeongjeon Hall is dedicated to kings whose ancestors were old by the standards of the current reigning king or whose reigns were short-lived, while the Jeongjeon Hall houses portraits of kings whose accomplishments during their reigns are well known. The memorial tablets of 19 kings and 30 queens are enshrined in Jeongjeon, while the memorial tablets of 16 kings and 18 queens are enshrined in Yeongnyeongjeon.

When the king visited this place, he followed a set route and ritualized procedures to wash himself and perform sacrifices, followed by a large number of people.

In front of the main hall is the Woldae Courtyard, which is 150 meters in length and 100 meters in width.

== Rituals and performances ==
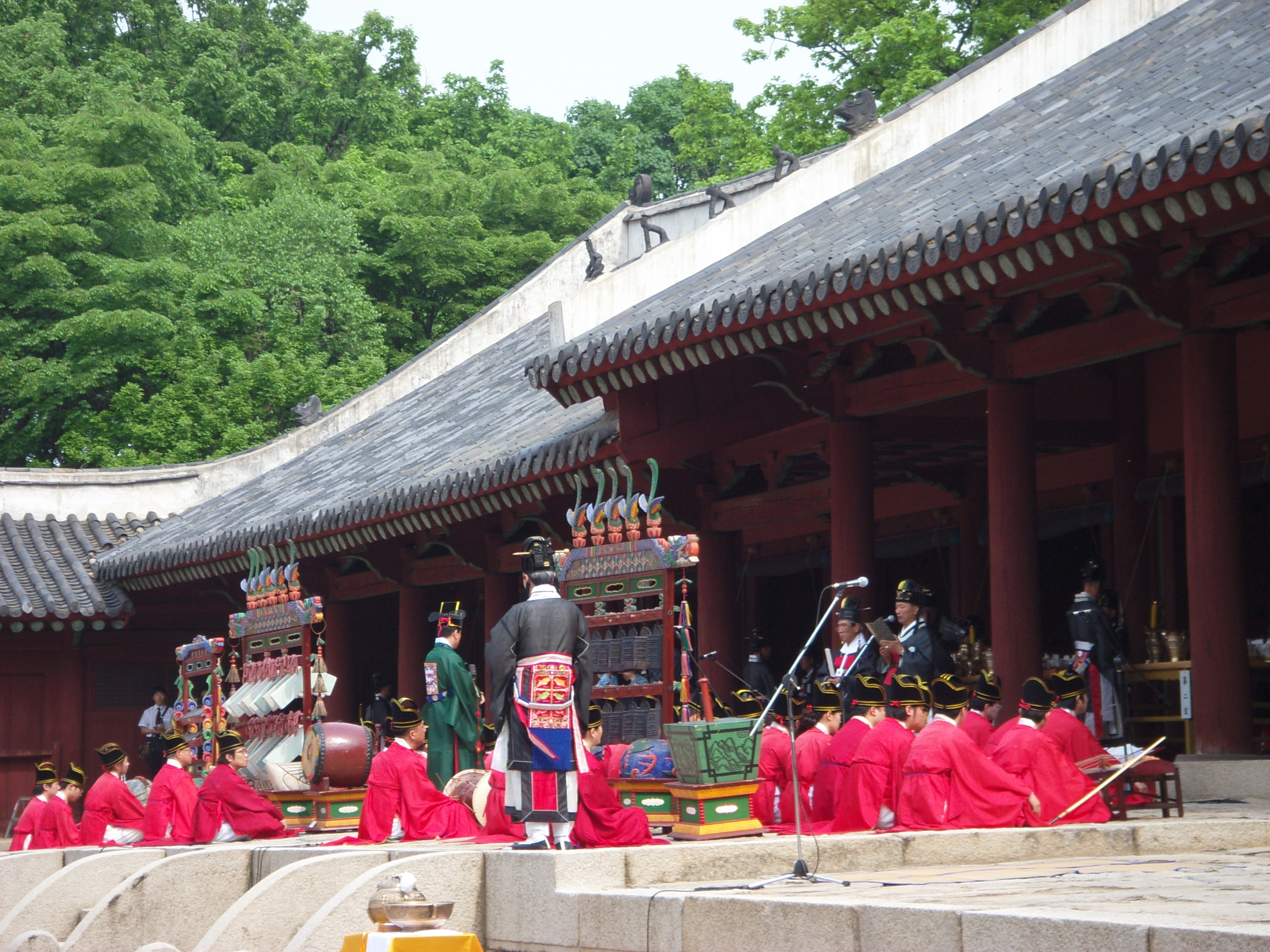
Performance of Jongmyo Jeryeak, May 2007.

An elaborate performance of ancient court music (with accompanying dance) known as jongmyo jeryeak (종묘제례악; 宗廟祭禮樂) is performed there each year for the jongmyo jerye ritual. Musicians, dancers, and scholars would perform Confucian rituals, such as the jongmyo daeje (royal shrine ritual) in the courtyard five times a year. Today, the rituals have been reconstructed and revived. The jongmyo daeje has been designated as Intangible Cultural Heritage and is performed every year on the first Sunday in May. The jongmyo jeryeak, the traditional court music of Joseon, is performed by the Royal Court Orchestra and has been designated as Intangible Cultural Heritage. This court music has its origins in Chinese court music that was brought to Korea during the Goryeo period (918–1392). King Sejong composed new music for the ritual based largely on hyangak (with some dangak) in 1447 and 1462.

The songs invite the ancestral spirits to descend from heaven to enjoy the kings' achievements in founding the dynasty and defending the country in order to encourage their descendants to follow in their footsteps. Today, the members of the Jeonju Lee Royal Family Association perform the rites to the accompaniment of music and dance provided by musicians from the National Center for Korean Traditional Performing Arts and dancers from the Gukak National High School.

== See also ==
- Taimiao, Beijing
- Thế Miếu, Huế

== Bibliography ==
- Hoon, Shin Young (2008). The Royal Palaces of Korea: Six Centuries of Dynastic Grandeur (Hardback). Singapore: Stallion Press. ISBN 978-981-08-0806-8.
