= Myo (shrine) =

Korean concept of Confucian shrine for jesa

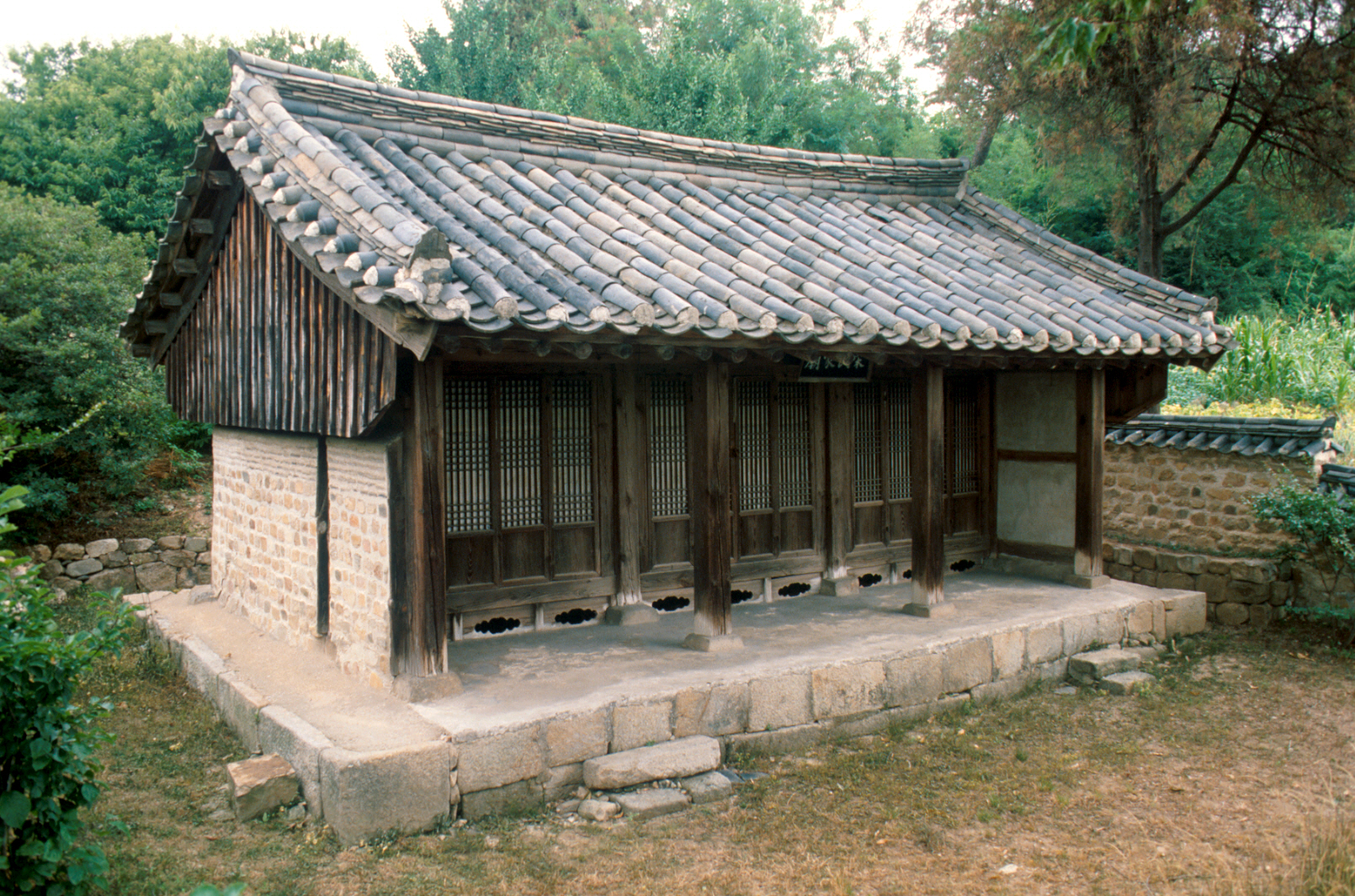
Picture of one Korean Song clan's Gamyo (가묘; 家廟) located in Daejeon

Myo (Korean: 묘; Hanja: 廟) is a Korean term for Confucian shrines, where the ritual jesa is held. While this concept is nowadays mainly known for the Joseon dynasty's shrine Jongmyo in Seoul, its history dates back to the Three Kingdoms period.

== History ==
The character 廟 originally encompassed two different meanings; first, it was referring to upper-class house of a noble family, and second, it was also referring to a place where emperor resides, perform rituals, and issues political orders. These various meanings of Myo later reorganized into referring a place or building where emperor performs ancestral worship rituals. In Korean civilization, concept of Myo (廟) is mainly known by famous UNESCO heritage Jongmyo shrine built by Joseon dynasty. Yet it is notifiable that, according to historical records, the Myo concept appears in Korean history first in the Three Kingdoms period. In this early Korean era, while the Myo was roughly referring to place or building of ritual worship jesa, it was not an equal concept to ancestral worship following strict Confucian protocol, which tries to define and categorize exact lineage of ancestors by instructions from Confucian classics. Instead, actual practice of the Myo in early Korean history was more like a broad concept of place for ancestral worship, Sijomyo (시조묘; 始祖廟). Later in Joseon, as architectural term, Myo was referring to a type of temple building compared to Dan (壇), a term usually referred to an open altar.

Concept of the Myo shrine (廟) redeveloped in Korean culture has a notable difference from Miao shrine (廟) in Chinese tradition in its usage. Roughly around East Asian cultural sphere, term of ancestral shrine (사당; 祠堂) and family shrine (가묘; 家廟; Gamyo; lit. 'family Myo shrine') were originally distinguishable in actual usages, as formers referred to general concept of place for worshiping distant family ancestors or sages, while latters meant place for worshiping relatively close family ancestors. However, when famous Chinense Confucian scholar Zhu Xi suggested replacing the term 家廟 with the broader term 祠堂 in the era of Southern Song empire, usage of the term 家廟 decreased in Chinese culture. So in Chinese culture, while the term "Miao shrine" became a word relatively confined to a meaning of Confucian shrine dedicated to noble entities such as royal family or famous heroes and sages, the term Cítáng (祠堂) or Ci shrine (祠) became a word that primarily refers to a type of Confucian ancestral shrine for ordinary scholar-official families other than royal family. Yet Koreans kept using term Gamyo (가묘; 家廟) to describe family ancestral shrine. For example, when Joseon was forcing establishments to adopt the neo-Confucian culture of jesa in its early era, to drive out influence of Buddhism culture on state governance, the main term used was Gamyo. Even in later era in Joseon, Koreans devised term Samyo to describe family ancestral shrine with portraits of ancestors, while Gamyo was referring to typical ancestral shrine with spirit tablets. So in this manner, Koreans widely regarded concept of Myo shrine as encompassing Jongmyo (as royal ancestral shrine), Munmyo (as Confucian temple for sages) and also Gamyo (as Confucian shrine for families of ordinary scholar-officials).

== See also ==
- Jongmyo
- Munmyo
- Dongmyo
- Korean Confucianism
