= Triệu Tổ miếu =

Ancestral Temple of the Founder
- Triệu Tổ miếu 肇祖廟
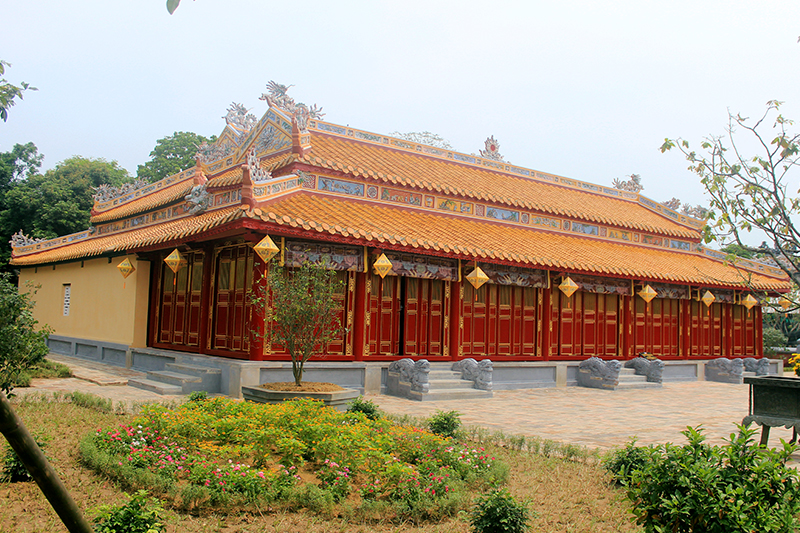
- Interactive map of the Ancestral Temple of the Founder area

General information
- Type: Royal tomb
- Location: Grand Inner City, Huế, Vietnam
- Coordinates: 16.4702°N 107.5801°E
- Construction started: 1804

Design and construction
- Architect: Đỗ Kỳ Mẫn

The Ancestral Temple of the Founder (Vietnamese: Triệu Tổ miếu, ‹The template Chuhan is being considered for deletion.› chữ Hán: 肇祖廟) was built either in 1804 or during the third year of Gia Long's rule to commemorate Duke Nguyễn Kim who was the ancestor of Nguyễn dynasty.

== History ==
Ancestral Temple of the Founder is located to the north of the Ancestral Temple. Its design was inspired by Ming's architecture, most notably with a rectangular perimeter that represents the character vương (王), three main doors facing southward. The interior of the temple consists of an altar, on which two plaques of the founding ancestor and his lady are placed.

A poem in Literary Chinese can be found inscribed on the ceiling, with its content praising the following merit of Duke Nguyễn Kim,

開國承家，Khai quốc thừa gia, (Founding the nation, succeeding the family)
守成繼體。Thủ thành kế thể. (Safeguarding and continuing the legacy)
報本崇原，Báo bản sùng nguyên, (Repaying the roots and honoring the origins)
洽斯百禮。Hiệp tư bách lễ. (Harmonizing with a hundred rites)

The temple was badly damaged during the 1968 Tet Offensive. Since then, the temple had been abandoned until 2014 when it underwent a 27-month period of restoration funded with US$700,000 by the United States Department of State. However, this "newly restored" temple was panned by the press for being too flashy and unaesthetic, given the original intent of how Huế's art works should look during the Golden Age. The mosaics on the roof are rendered rough and do not seem to describe a classical legend of Confucius.
