= Traditional Korean musical instruments =

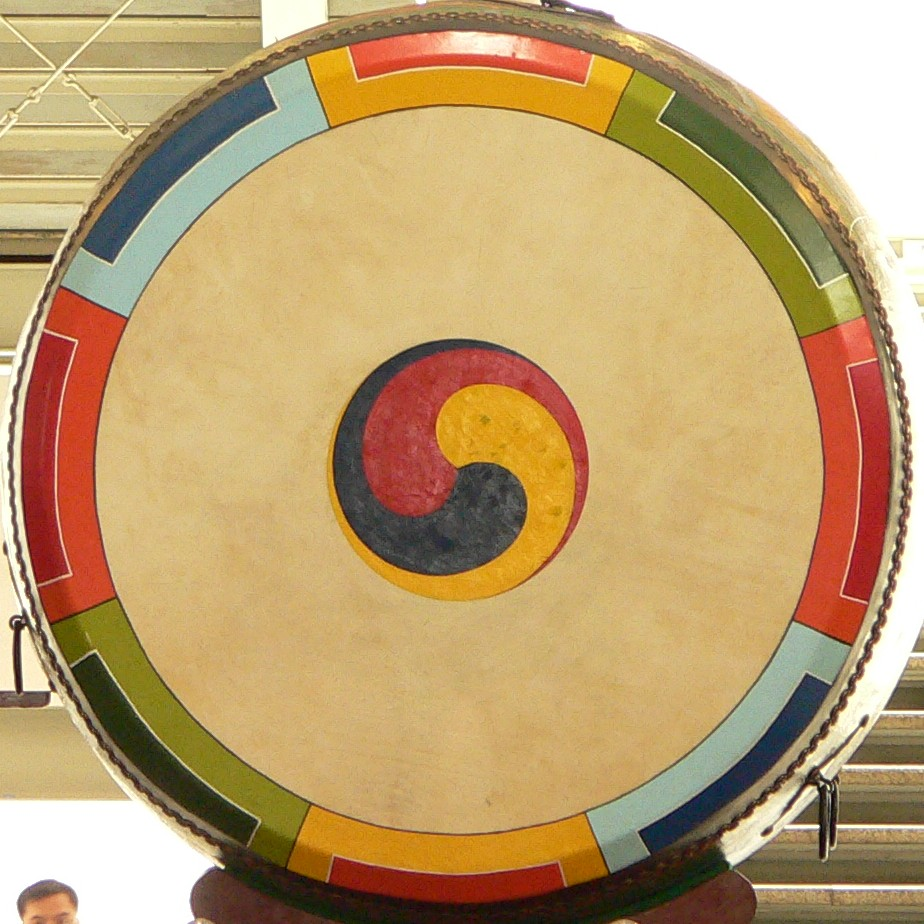
Buk, Korean traditional drum

Traditional Korean musical instruments comprise a wide range of string, wind, and percussion instruments.

== String ==
Korean string instruments include those that are plucked, bowed, and struck. Most Korean string instruments use silk strings, except as noted.

=== Plucked ===
==== Zithers ====
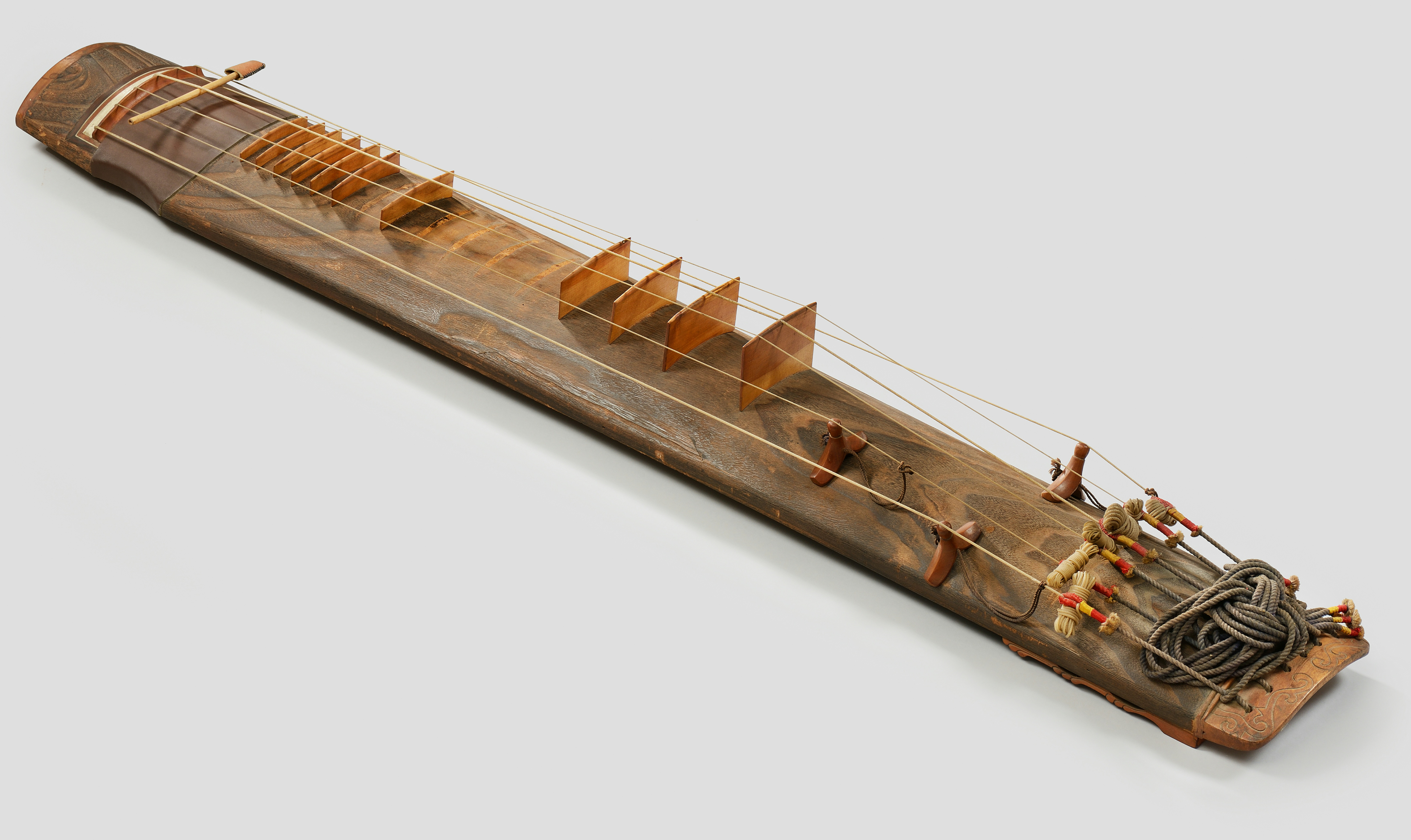
Geomungo

Gayageum

- Gayageum (가야금; 伽倻琴) – A long zither with 12 strings; modern versions may have 13, 15, 17, 18, 21, 22, or 25 strings
- Geomungo (거문고) – A fretted bass zither with six to eleven silk strings that is plucked with a bamboo stick and played with a weight made out of cloth
  - Cheolhyeongeum (철현금; 鐵絃琴) – A geomungo with 8 steel strings plucked with a bamboo stick and played with a slide made out of either glass or metal in the manner of a slide guitar, developed in the 20th century^{photo 1photo 2}
- Daejaeng (대쟁; 大筝) – A long zither with 15 strings, slightly larger than the gayageum; (basically a 15 String version of the Ajaeng but played w/ a Plectrum) it was used during the Goryeo period but is no longer used^{photo} However it is being revived for song covers.
- Seul (슬; 瑟) – A long zither with 25 strings, derived from the Chinese se; used today only in Munmyo jeryeak (Korean Confucian ritual music)^{photo}
- Geum (금; 琴) – A 7-stringed zither, derived from the Chinese guqin; also called chilheyongeum; used today only in Munmyo jeryeak (Korean Confucian ritual music)^{photo}
- Ongnyugeum (옥류금; 玉流琴) – A large modernized box zither with 33 nylon-wrapped metal strings, developed in 1973; used only in North Korea (pronounced ongryugeum in North Korea)

==== Harps ====
- Gonghu (공후; 箜篌) – Harps (no longer used). There were four subtypes according to shape:
  - Sogonghu (소공후; 小箜篌; lit. 'small harp') – harp with angled sound box, 13 strings, and a peg that is tucked into the player's belt
  - Sugonghu (수공후; 豎箜篌; lit. 'vertical harp') – vertical harp without sound box and 21 strings ^{photo}
  - Wagonghu (와공후; 臥箜篌; lit. 'lying down harp') – Arched harp with a large internal sound box and 13 strings, similar to Burmese saung gauk ^{photo}
  - Daegonghu (대공후; 大箜篌) – large vertical harp with 23-strings

==== Lutes ====
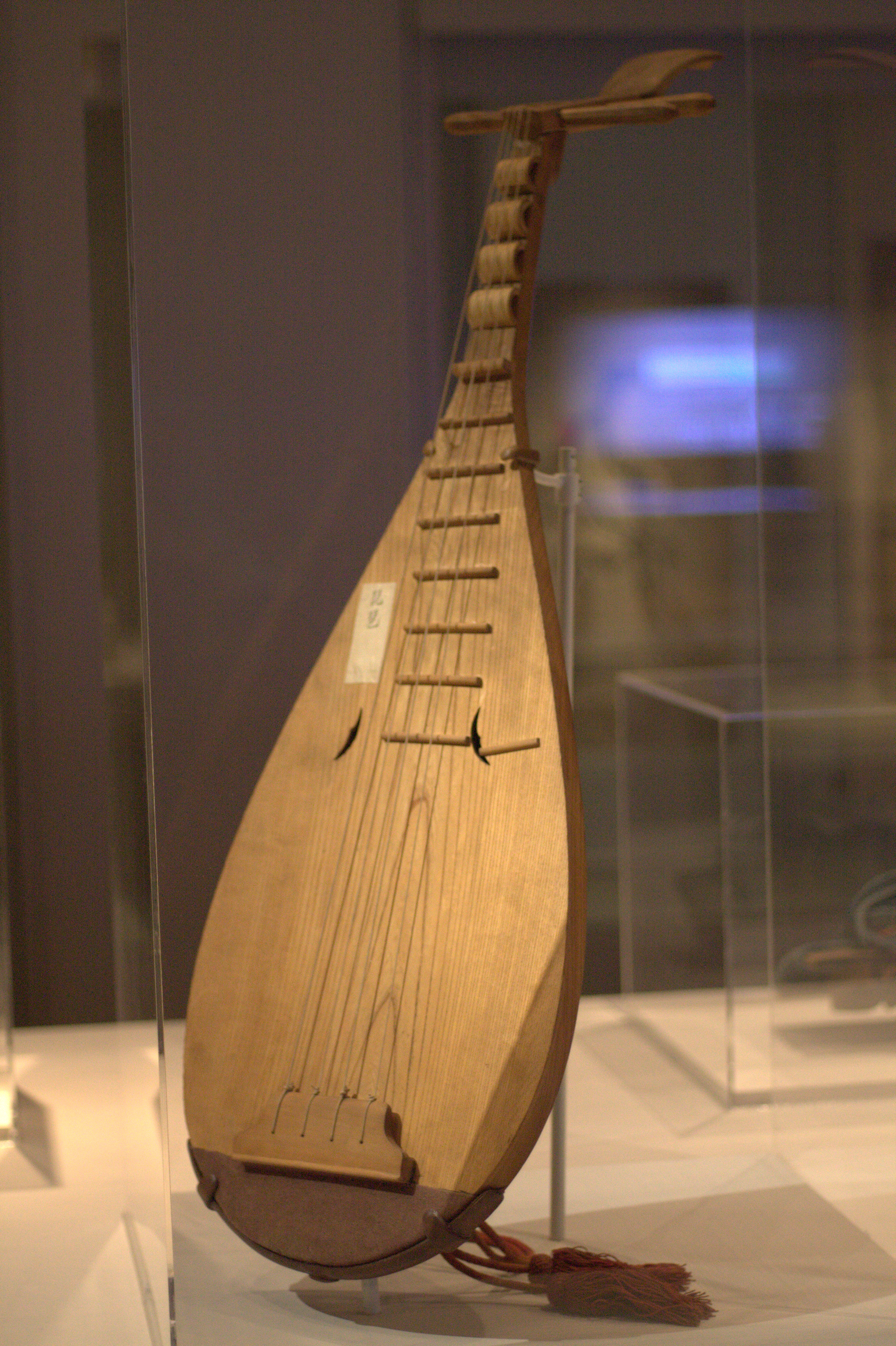
Bipa

- Bipa (비파; 琵琶) – A pear-shaped lute with five strings (hyangbipa or jikgyeongbipa) or four strings (dangbipa). Uncommon today; most modern recreations are modelled on the Chinese pipa
- Wolgeum (월금; 月琴) – A lute with a moon-shaped wooden body, four strings, and 13 frets; no longer used
- Eoeungeum (어은금) – A pear-shaped lute with five strings similar to hyangbipa; used only in North Korea

=== Bowed ===
==== Fiddles ====
- Haegeum (해금; 奚琴) – A vertical fiddle with two strings; derived from the ancient Chinese xiqin
- Sohaegeum (소해금; 小奚琴) – A modernized fiddle with four strings similar to a modern violin; used only in North Korea
- Junghaegeum (중해금; 中奚琴) - A modernized fiddle with four strings similar to a modern viola; used only in North Korea
- Daehaegeum (대해금; 大奚琴) - A modernized fiddle with four strings similar to a modern cello; used only in North Korea
- Jeohaegeum (저해금; 低奚琴) - A modernized fiddle with four strings similar to a modern double bass; used only in North Korea

==== Zithers ====
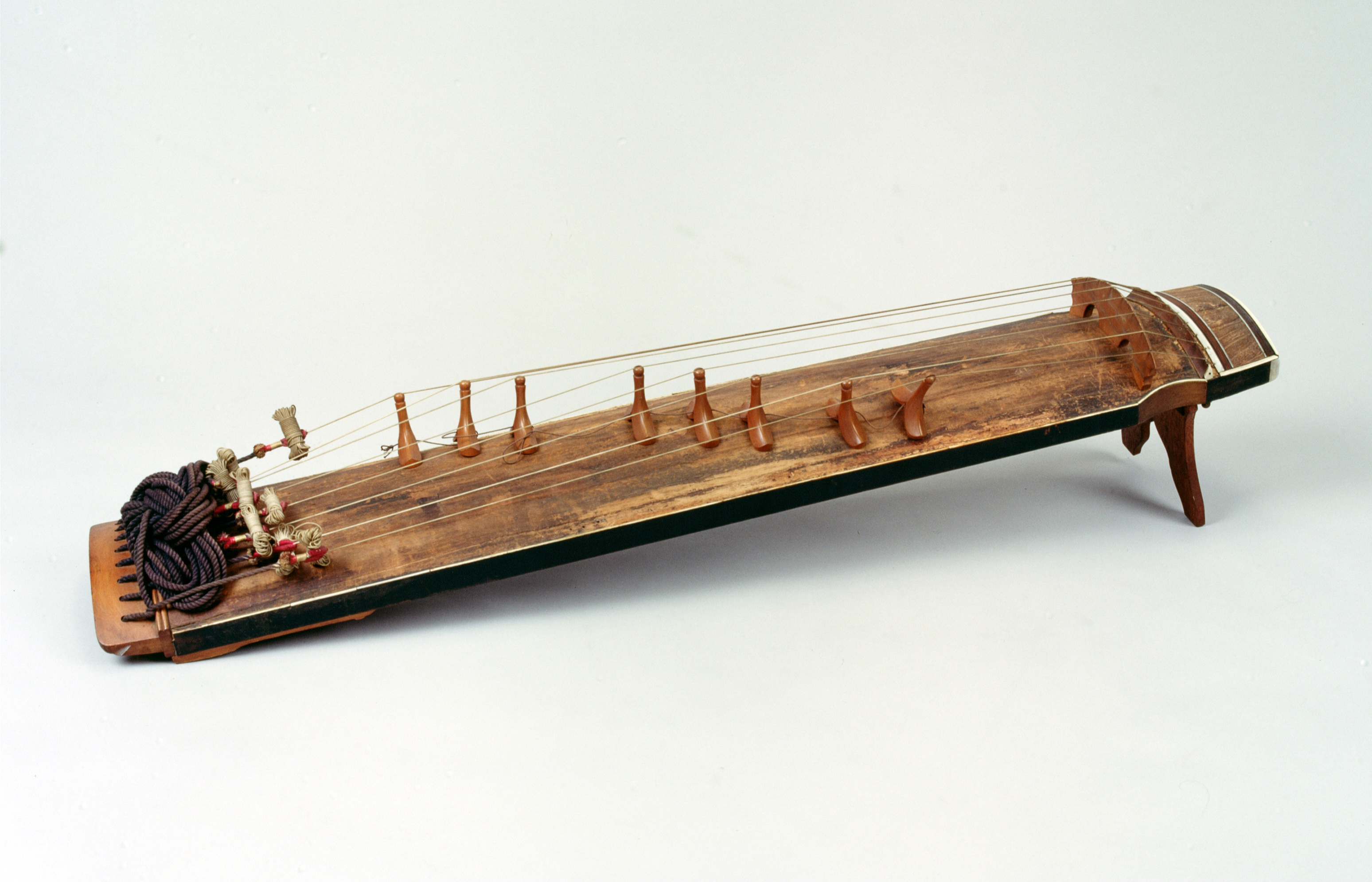
Ajaeng

- Ajaeng (아쟁; 牙箏) – A zither bowed with a wooden stick, derived from the Chinese yazheng

=== Struck ===
- Yanggeum (양금; 洋琴) – A hammered dulcimer with metal strings, struck with bamboo mallets; derived from the Chinese yangqin

== Wind ==
=== Flutes ===
==== Transverse ====
- Daegeum (대금; 大笒) – A large transverse bamboo flute with six finger-holes and an additional hole covered by a buzzing membrane
- Junggeum (중금; 中笒) – A medium-sized transverse bamboo flute with six finger-holes, without a buzzing membrane; rarely used today
- Sogeum (소금; 小琴; 小笒) – A small transverse bamboo flute with six finger-holes, without a buzzing membrane
- Dangjeok당적; 唐笛 () – A small transverse bamboo flute of Tang Chinese origin, slightly smaller than the junggeum
- Ji (지; 篪) – An ancient transverse bamboo flute with a protruding notched blowhole and five finger holes (one in the back and four in the front), derived from the Chinese chí. Used only in aak and Munmyo jeryeak (Korean Confucian ritual music)

==== End-blown ====
- Danso (단소; 短簫) – A small notched vertical bamboo flute with four finger-holes
- Tungso (퉁소; 洞簫) – A long notched vertical bamboo flute with five finger-holes; originally called tongso
- Yak (약; 籥) – A notched vertical bamboo flute with three finger-holes; used in Munmyo jeryeak (Korean Confucian ritual music)
- Jeok (적; 篴)
- So (소; 簫) – A pan flute; derived from the Chinese paixiao; used only in Munmyo jeryeak (Korean Confucian ritual music
- Hun (훈; 塤) – A globular flute made of baked clay originating from prehistoric times; end-blown like a shakuhachi, unlike an ocarina (which is a whistle design). Derived from the Chinese xun

=== Oboes ===
- Piri (피리) – A cylindrical oboe with a bamboo body. There are several varieties of piri:
  - Hyang piri (향피리; 鄕—)
  - Se piri (세피리; 細—)
  - Dang piri (당피리; 唐—)
  - Dae piri (대피리; 大—) – A modernised instrument with clarinet-like keys, developed in North Korea
  - Jeo piri (저피리; 低—) – A modernised instrument with clarinet-like keys, in the contrabass register, developed in North Korea
- Taepyeongso (태평소; 太平簫; also called hojeok, saenap or nallari) – A conical oboe with a wooden body and metal bell

=== Free-reed ===
- Saenghwang (생황; 笙簧) – A free-reed mouth organ with 17 bamboo pipes, derived from the Chinese sheng; uncommon today

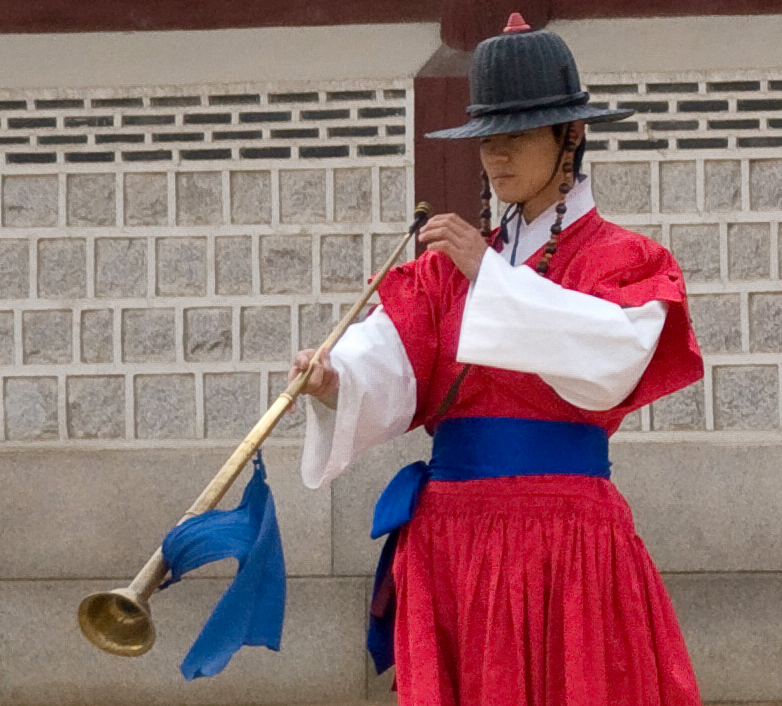
A player of the nabal

=== Trumpets ===
- Nabal (나발; 喇叭) – Long metal trumpet; used in daechwita
- Nagak (나각; 螺角) – Sea shell horn, also called sora; used in daechwita

== Percussion ==
- Jong (종; 鐘) – A bronze bell
- Pyeonjong (편종; 編鐘) – A set of 16 tuned bronze bells used in ancient court music; derived from the Chinese bianzhong
- Teukgjong (특종; 特鐘) – A single large bronze bell
- Pyeongyeong (편경; 編磬) – A set of 16 tuned stone chimes used in ancient court music; derived from the Chinese bianqing
- Teukgyeong (특경; 特磬) – A single large tuned stone chime
- Banghyang (방향; 方響) – A metallophone with 16 tuned iron slabs; derived from the Chinese fangxiang
- Ulla (운라; 雲鑼; 雲羅) – A set of ten small tuned gongs in a wooden frame; derived from the Chinese yunluo

=== Drums ===
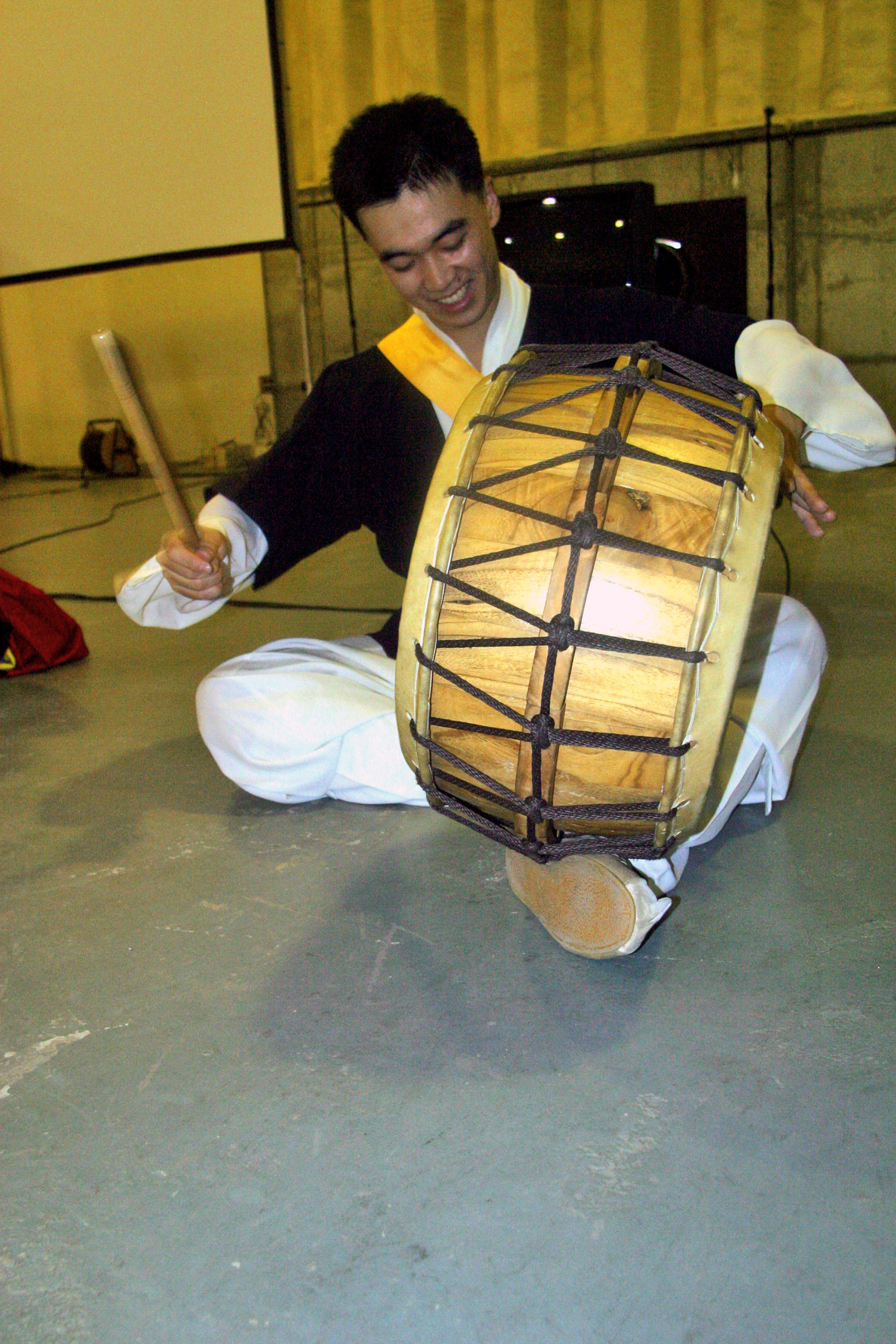
- The buk
  Buk (북) – A barrel drum used primarily in pansori, pungmul, and samulnori. The term buk is also used in Korean as a generic term to refer to any type of drum.
  - Pungmul-buk(풍물북) – used in pungmul (풍물)
  - Sori-buk (소리북) – used to accompany pansori (판소리)
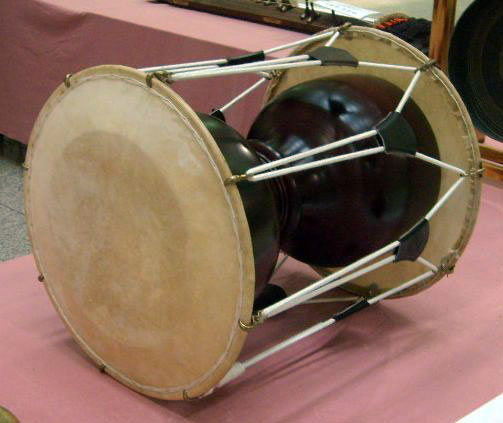
    The janggu
- Janggu or Janggo (장구; 장고; 杖鼓; 長鼓) – A double-headed hourglass-shaped drum generally played with one stick and one hand
- Galgo (갈고; 羯鼓) – Double-headed hourglass-shaped drum similar to the janggo but played with two sticks and thinner drum heads; sometimes called yanggo or yangjanggo; no longer commonly used
- Jingo (진고; 晉鼓) – Largest barrel drum
- Jeolgo (절고; 節鼓) – Barrel drum
- Jwago (좌고; 座鼓) – A barrel drum in a wooden frame
- Geongo (건고; 建鼓) – Huge barrel drum
- Yonggo (용고; 龍鼓) – A barrel drum with a dragon painted on its shell; used in daechwita
- Eunggo (응고; 應鼓) – Barrel drum suspended from a frame
- Sakgo – (삭고; 朔鼓) – A long barrel drum suspended from a wooden frame
- Gyobanggo (교방고; 敎坊鼓) – Flat drum suspended from a frame
- Junggo (중고; 中鼓) – Flat drum suspended from a frame; similar to the gyobanggo but larger
- Sogo (소고; 小鼓) – A small hand-held drum
- Nogo (노고; 路鼓) – A set of two drums pierced by a pole
- Nodo (노도; 路鼗) – A set of two small drums on a pole, which is twisted to play; used in ritual music
- Yeongdo (영도; hanja:靈鼗) – Four drums on a pole, which is twisted to play; used in ritual music
- Noedo (뇌도; 雷鼗)) – six small drums hung in a frame; used in ritual music
- Noego (뇌고; 雷鼓) – Three small barrel drums on a pole, which is twisted to play; used in ritual music
- Do (도) – single pellet drum on a pole

=== Gongs ===
- Kkwaenggwari (꽹과리) – A small gong used primarily in folk music
- Jing (징) – A large gong; originally pronounced jeong (정; 鉦)

=== Cymbals ===
- Jabara (자바라; also called bara, bal, or jegeum) – pair of large brass cymbals, The name Zabara comes from Calpara.

=== Wooden instruments ===
- Bak (박; 拍) – A wooden clapper; used in ancient court and ritual music
- Chuk (축; 柷) – A wooden box, played by hitting a stick on the inside, used to mark beats or sections; derived from the Chinese zhù; used in ancient ritual music
- Eo (어; 敔) – A wooden percussion instrument carved in the shape of a tiger with a serrated back, played by running a bamboo whisk across it to mark the ends of sections; derived from the Chinese yǔ

=== Clay instruments ===
- Bu (부; 缶) – A clay pot, derived from the Chinese fǒu; used in Munmyo jeryeak

== See also ==
- Akhak Gwebeom
- Korean music
- String instruments
