= Dangjeok =

Korean bamboo flute

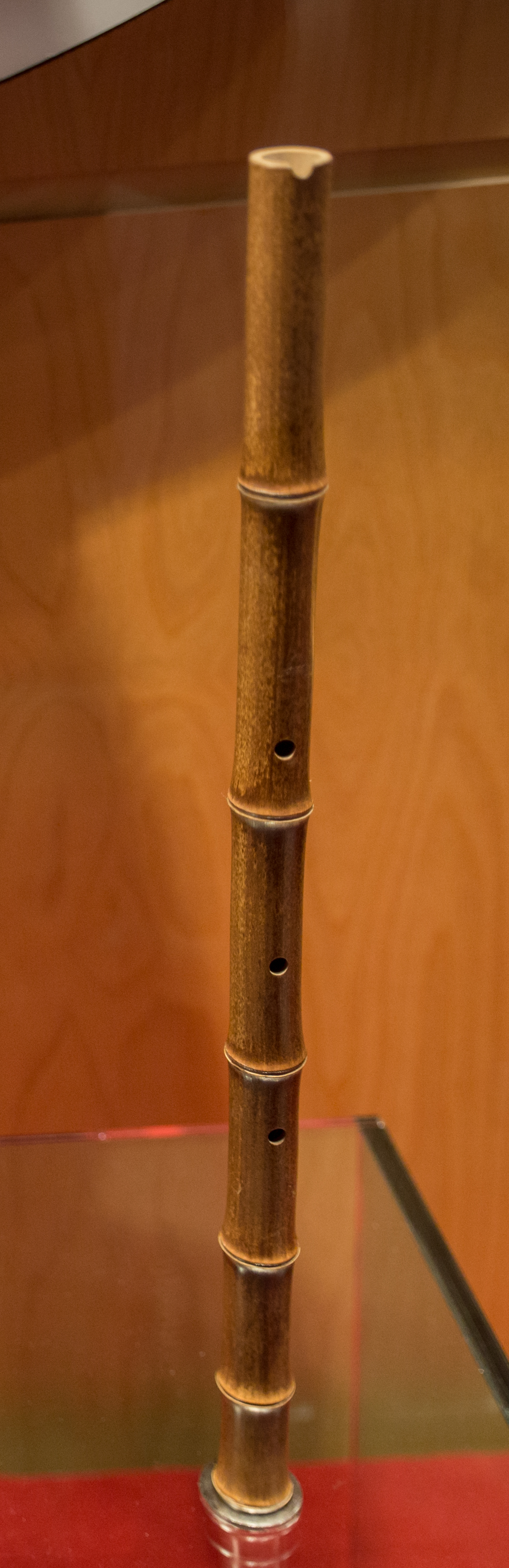

Woodwind instrument
- Classification: Aerophone
- Hornbostel–Sachs classification: 421.121.12 (Open side-blown flutes with fingerholes)

Related instruments
- Daegeum; Dizi; Junggeum; Limbe; Minteki; Sogeum

- Dangjeok
- Hangul: 당적
- Hanja: 唐笛
- RR: dangjeok
- MR: tangjŏk

The dangjeok (Korean: 당적) is a small end blown bamboo flute used in traditional Korean music. Slightly smaller than its close instrument relative, the junggeum, the dangjeok is of Chinese origin. Its name, derived from the Chinese Tang dynasty, dangjeok translates to "Tang end blown bamboo flute." The dangjeok is an aerophone which gives off a clear and bright sound, and has a limited one and a half octave range according to the ancient Korean music treatise, the akhakgwebeom. It is often played accompanied by the Korean lute and xylophone. Remodeled to enhance range, it is made of yellow bamboo or sick bamboo, and possesses a single end-blowing notch, and seven holes to control pitch, though the seventh hole is not used. Of traditional and current instruments of Korean origin, the dangjeok has the highest pitch.

== See also ==
- Daegeum
- Junggeum
- Sogeum
- Traditional Korean musical instruments
- Traditional music of Korea
