= Zhengni =

Chinese traditional bowed zither

The zhengni (琤尼) is a traditional Chinese bowed zither, similar to the ancient Chinese instrument yazheng and Korean ajaeng. It is used by the Zhuang people of Guangxi.

== See also ==
- Chinese music
- List of Chinese musical instruments
