= Sogeum =

Musical instrument

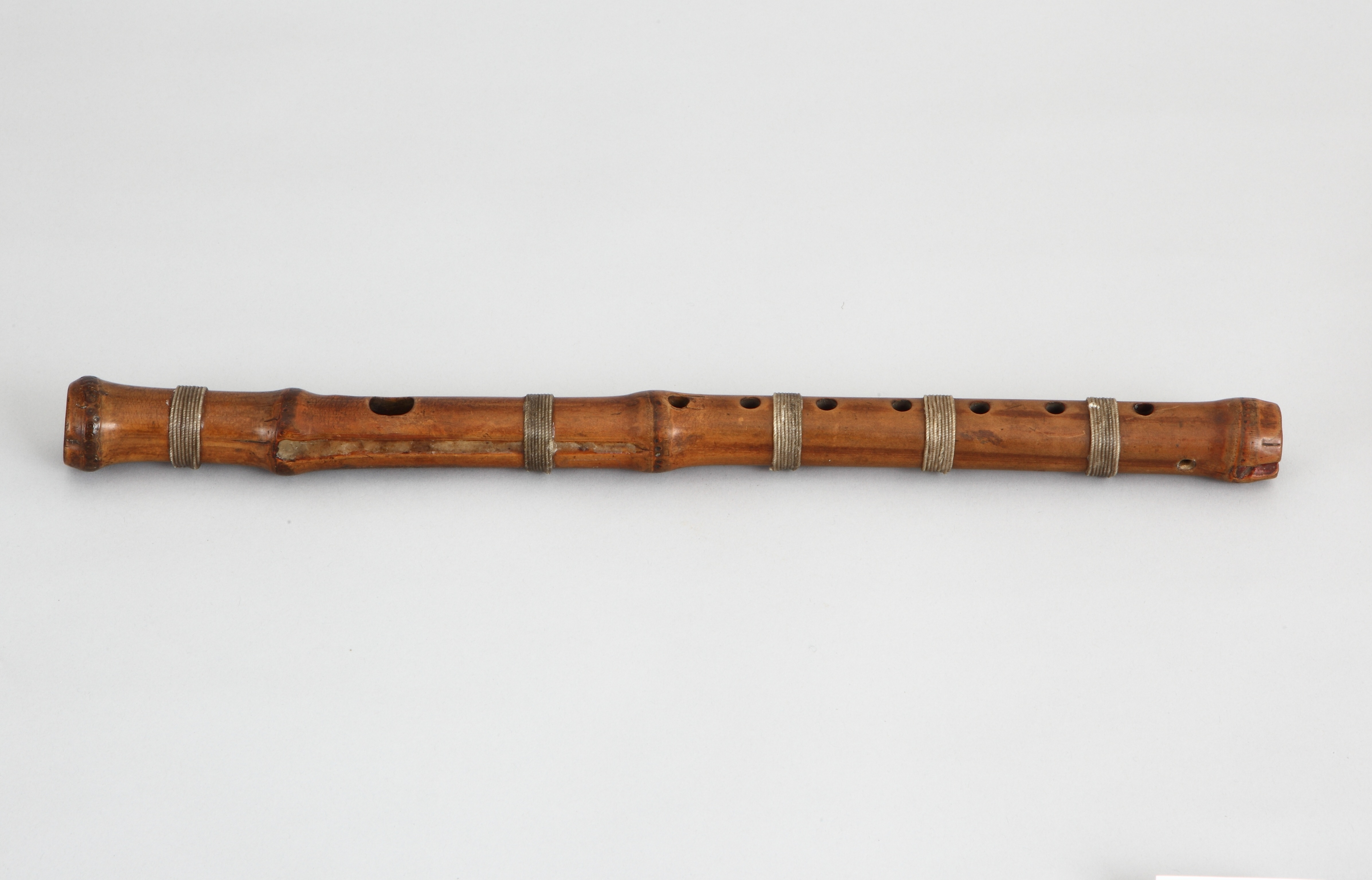

Woodwind instrument
- Classification: Aerophone
- Hornbostel–Sachs classification: 421.121.12 (Open side-blown flutes with fingerholes)

Related instruments
- Daegeum; Dangjeok; Dizi; Junggeum; Limbe; Minteki

- Sogeum
- Hangul: 소금
- Hanja: 小笒
- RR: sogeum
- MR: sogŭm

The sogeum (Korean: 소금; also spelled sogum or sogŭm) is a small bamboo transverse flute used in traditional Korean music. Unlike the larger daegeum, it does not have a buzzing membrane (although it did have one in ancient times). It is used in court, aristocratic, and folk music, as well as in contemporary classical music, popular music, and film scores.

The overall length and thickness are not constant because sogeum is made of natural bamboo, but it is 40 cm long and 2.2 cm thick.

Other larger flutes in the same family include the medium-sized junggeum and the large daegeum; the three together are known as samjuk (hangul: 삼죽; hanja: 三竹; literally "three bamboo"), as the three primary flutes of the Silla period.

The sogeum has the highest and clearest tone among wind instruments, and is often composed of singular numbers in ensemble, where other wind instruments are composed of multiple instruments.

== Playing method ==
Sogeum is played in the same way as playing the Daegeum. Sogeum can theoretically sound all twelve notes of the chromatic scale, but actually only eight notes are played naturally. Sogeum plays a role of making the songs that require high tone and clear tone in the main music, and it is rarely used as a solo instrument.

== See also ==
- Bamboo musical instruments
- Daegeum
- Junggeum
- Traditional music of Korea
- Traditional Korean musical instruments
