= Junggeum =

Korean bamboo flute

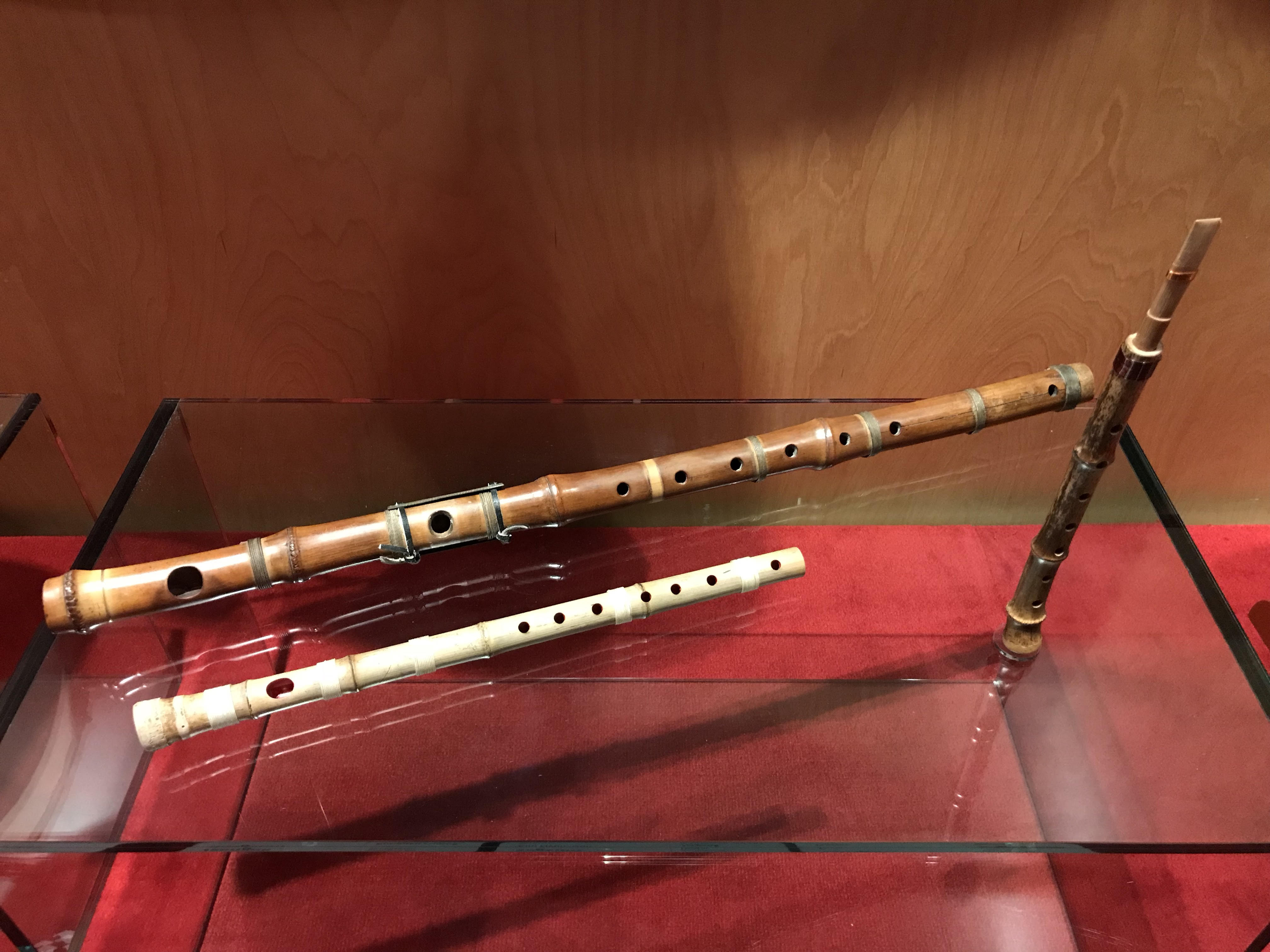
- Top a daegeum, in the middle a junggeum, to the right a piri.

Woodwind instrument
- Hornbostel–Sachs classification: 421.121.12 (Open side-blown flutes with fingerholes)

Related instruments
- Daegeum; Dangjeok; Dizi; Limbe; Minteki; Sogeum

- Junggeum
- Hangul: 중금
- Hanja: 中笒
- RR: junggeum
- MR: chunggŭm

The junggeum (Korean: 중금), also chunggum or chunggŭm, is a medium-sized transverse bamboo flute formerly used in traditional Korean music. Unlike the larger daegeum, it does not have a buzzing membrane (although it did have one in ancient times). It was used in court, aristocratic, and folk music in premodern times, but is rarely used today.

Other flutes in the same family include the daegeum and sogeum; the three together are known as samjuk (hangul: 삼죽; hanja: 三竹; literally "three bamboo"), as the three primary flutes of the Silla period. Both of these are still used in traditional music, as well as in contemporary classical music, popular music, and film scores.

The junggeum currently used in the National Gugak Center is about 65 cm long and 1.7 cm in diameter.

== See also ==
- Bamboo musical instruments
- Daegeum
- Dizi
- Traditional music of Korea
- Sogeum
- Traditional Korean musical instruments
