= Daegeum =

Korean bamboo flute

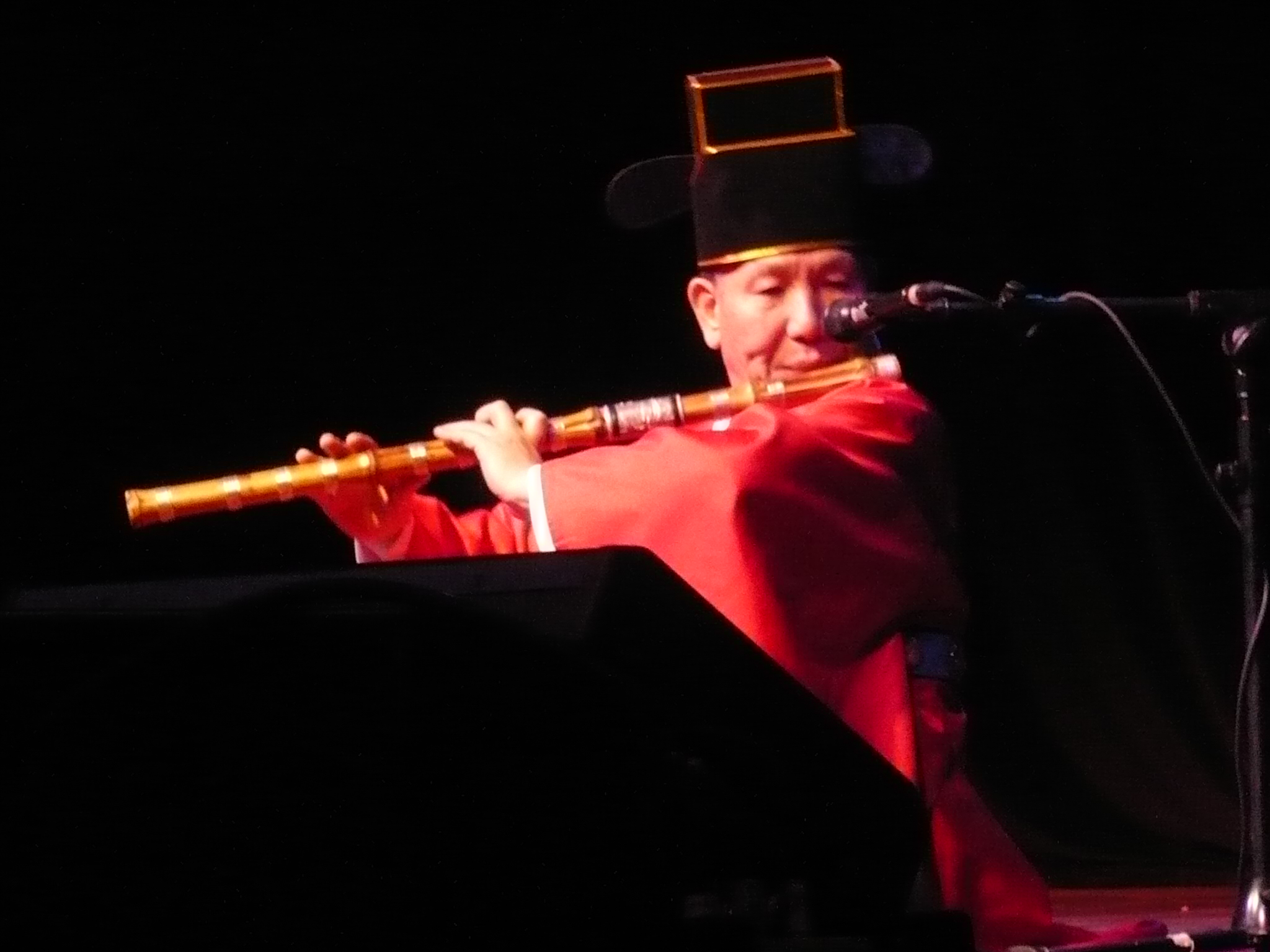

Woodwind instrument
- Classification: Aerophone
- Hornbostel–Sachs classification: 421.121.12 (Open side-blown flutes with fingerholes)

Related instruments
- Dangjeok; Dizi; Junggeum; Limbe; Minteki; Sogeum

- Daegeum
- Hangul: 대금
- Hanja: 大笒
- RR: daegeum
- MR: taegŭm

The daegeum (also spelled taegum, daegum or taegŭm) is a large bamboo flute, a transverse flute used in traditional Korean music. It has a buzzing acoustic membrane. It is used in court, aristocratic, and folk music, as well as in contemporary classical music, popular music, and film scores. And daegeum has a wide range and has a fixed pitch, so other instruments tune in to the daegeum when playing together. There are two types of daegeum: Jeongak and Sanjo. Jeongak Daegeum is a bit longer than Sanjo Daegeum and is the formal daegeum used historically at court. Sanjo Daegum is a bit shorter and historically more associated with the commoners. They both have the aforementioned buzzing membrane.

Smaller flutes in the same family include the junggeum (Korean: 중금; Hanja: 中笒) and sogeum (Korean: 소금; Hanja: 小笒), neither of which today have a buzzing membrane. The three together are known as samjuk (Korean: 삼죽; Hanja: 三竹; literally "three bamboo"), as the three primary flutes of the Silla period.

The solo performance called daegeum sanjo was pronounced an Important Intangible Cultural Properties of Korea by the Cultural Heritage Administration of South Korea in 1971.

== History ==
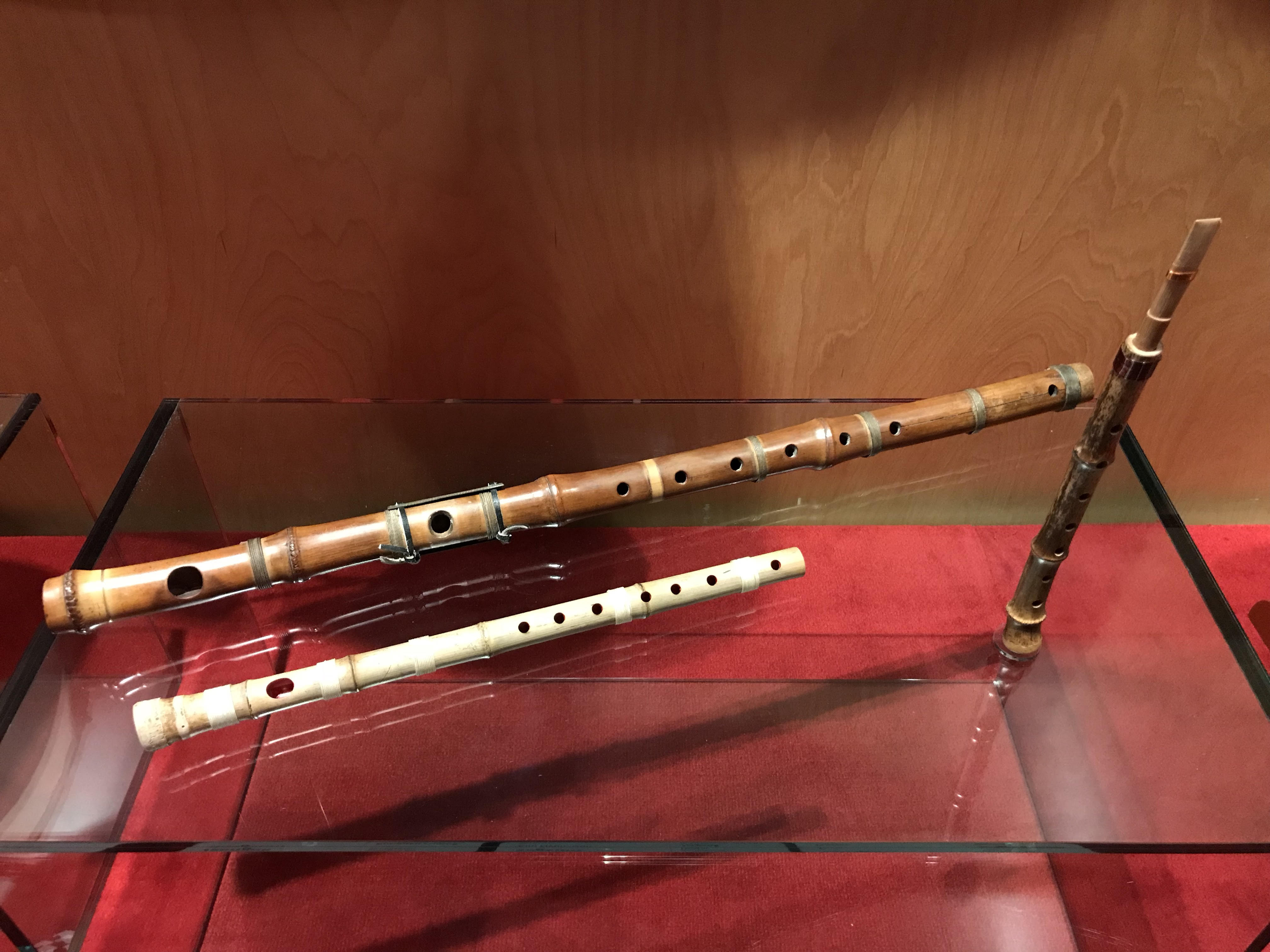
Top a daegeum, in the middle a junggeum, to the right a piri.

According to Korean folklore, the daegeum is said to have been invented when King Sinmun of Silla was informed by Park Suk Jung, his caretaker of the ocean (Korean: 해관; Hanja: 海官) in 681 that a small island was floating toward a Buddhist temple in the East Sea. The king ordered his caretaker of the sun to test whether this was good luck. The caretaker replied that a dead king who turned into a sea dragon, and two great warriors are giving a gift to protect Silla, and if the king would visit the sea, he would receive a priceless gift. The king soon sent a person to look for the gift. The person replied that a bamboo tree on the top of the island becomes two in the morning and one in the night. On the next day, the world shook and it rained and wind blew, and the world was thrown into darkness for a week. When the king went to the island himself, a dragon appeared and told him that if the bamboo on the top of the island was cut down, made into a flute, and blown, the country would be peaceful. The king cut down the tree, and the flute made from the bamboo was called manpasikjeok (Korean: 만파식적; Hanja: 萬波息笛).

== See also ==
- Bamboo musical instruments
- Di mo
- Dizi
- Junggeum
- Korean folklore
- Traditional music of Korea
- Sogeum
- Traditional Korean musical instruments
