= Yazheng =

Traditional Chinese string instrument

Zhazheng
- Classification: Bowed string instrument

Related instruments
- Ajaeng (Korea)

The yazheng (simplified Chinese: 轧筝; traditional Chinese: 軋箏; pinyin: yàzhēng; also spelled zha zheng or zha cheng) is a Chinese string instrument. It is a traditional zither similar to the guzheng but bowed by scraping with a rosined stick or a horsehair bow, (or plucked sometimes). The musical instrument was popular in the Tang dynasty, but is today little used except in the folk music of some parts of northern China, where it is called yaqin (simplified Chinese: 轧琴; traditional Chinese: 軋琴).

Court musician playing a zhazheng (left)

== Playing ==
The zhazheng is generally played while seated on the floor. It has a tone similar to that of a viola, but raspier. Some contemporary players prefer to use an actual horsehair bow rather than a stick, believing the sound to be smoother. The instrument is used in court, aristocratic, and folk music, as well as in contemporary classical music and film scores.

The Korean ajaeng (hangul: 아쟁; hanja: 牙箏) is derived from the yazheng.

In 2002, the People's Republic of China released a postage stamp featuring the instrument.

The zhengni (筝尼) is a similar instrument used by the Zhuang people of the southern Chinese region of Guangxi. After passing to Japan, it became a Assō (nihongo: 軋箏, hiragana: あっそう) and Ryukyu, Japan, it became a teisō (nihongo: 提箏, hiragana: ていそう). In Vietnam, it became a nha tranh in Nhã nhạc.

== See also ==
- Guzheng
- Traditional Chinese musical instruments

== Videos ==
- 轧琴 (bowed zither) from China
- 夢裏相思
- 金鳳凰
- 黃福安 - 文枕琴
- - 箏族魅力系列 (2)
