= Akhak kwebŏm =

15th century Korean text on music

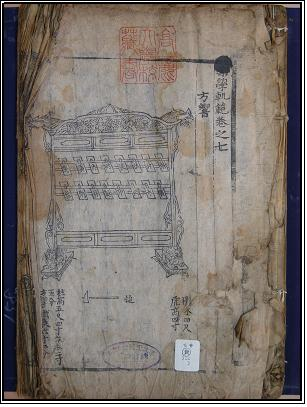
- Page from the Akhak kwebŏm depicting a banghyang (metallophone)

Korean name
- Hangul: 악학궤범
- Hanja: 樂學軌範
- RR: Akhak gwebeom
- MR: Akhak kwebŏm

The Akhak kwebŏm (Korean: 악학궤범; Hanja: 樂學軌範; lit. Musical Canon) is a nine-volume treatise on music, written in Korea in the 15th century, in the Joseon Dynasty. It is written by hand in hanja, and depicts, in line drawings, most of the musical instruments in use at the time, with detailed descriptions and fingerings.

== Gallery ==
Akhak kwebŏm

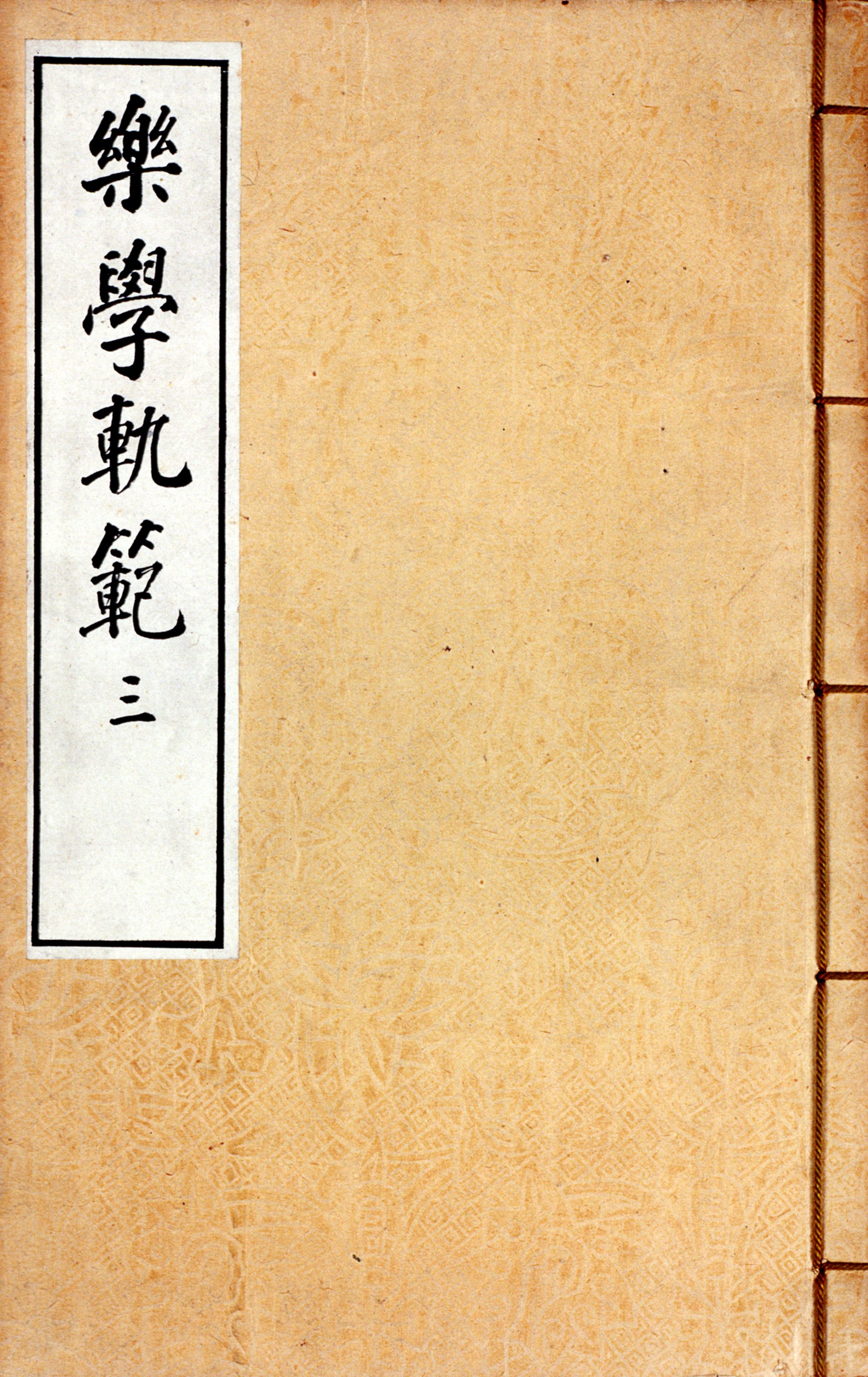
Copy of the Akhak kwebŏm

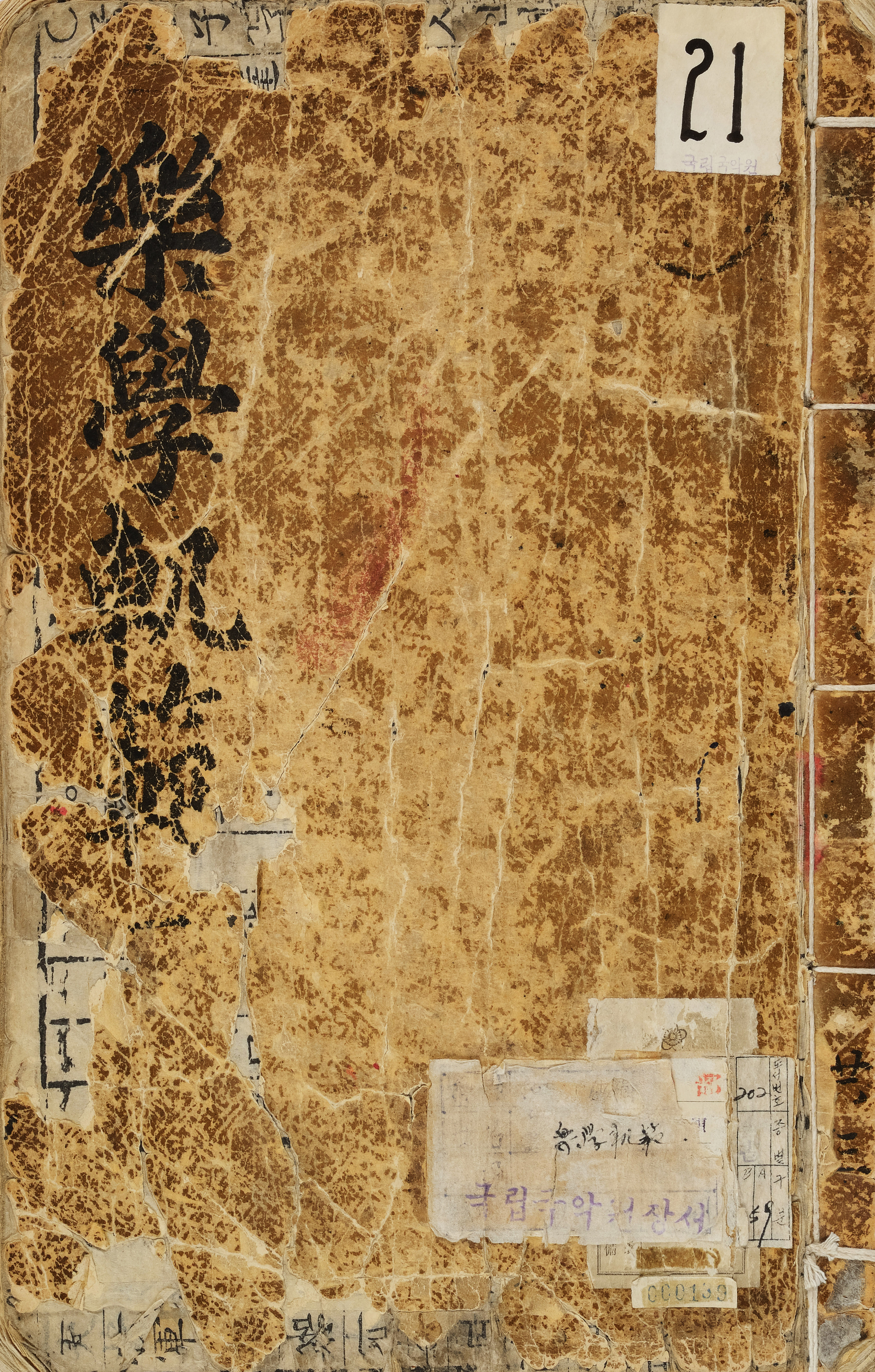
First edition of the Akhak kwebŏm

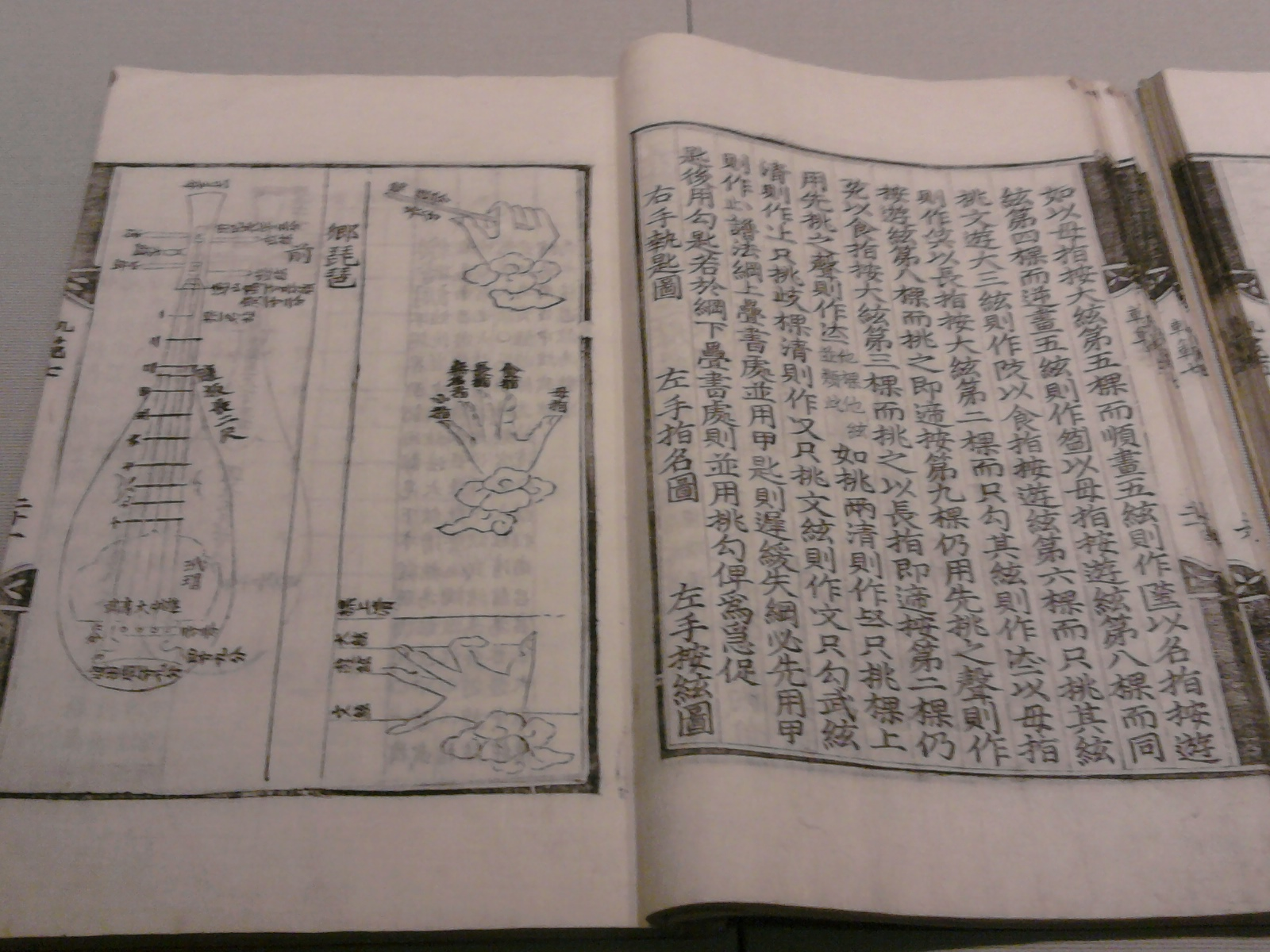

== See also ==
- Traditional Korean musical instruments
- Gayageum
- ajaeng
