= Ajaeng =

Traditional Korean string instrument

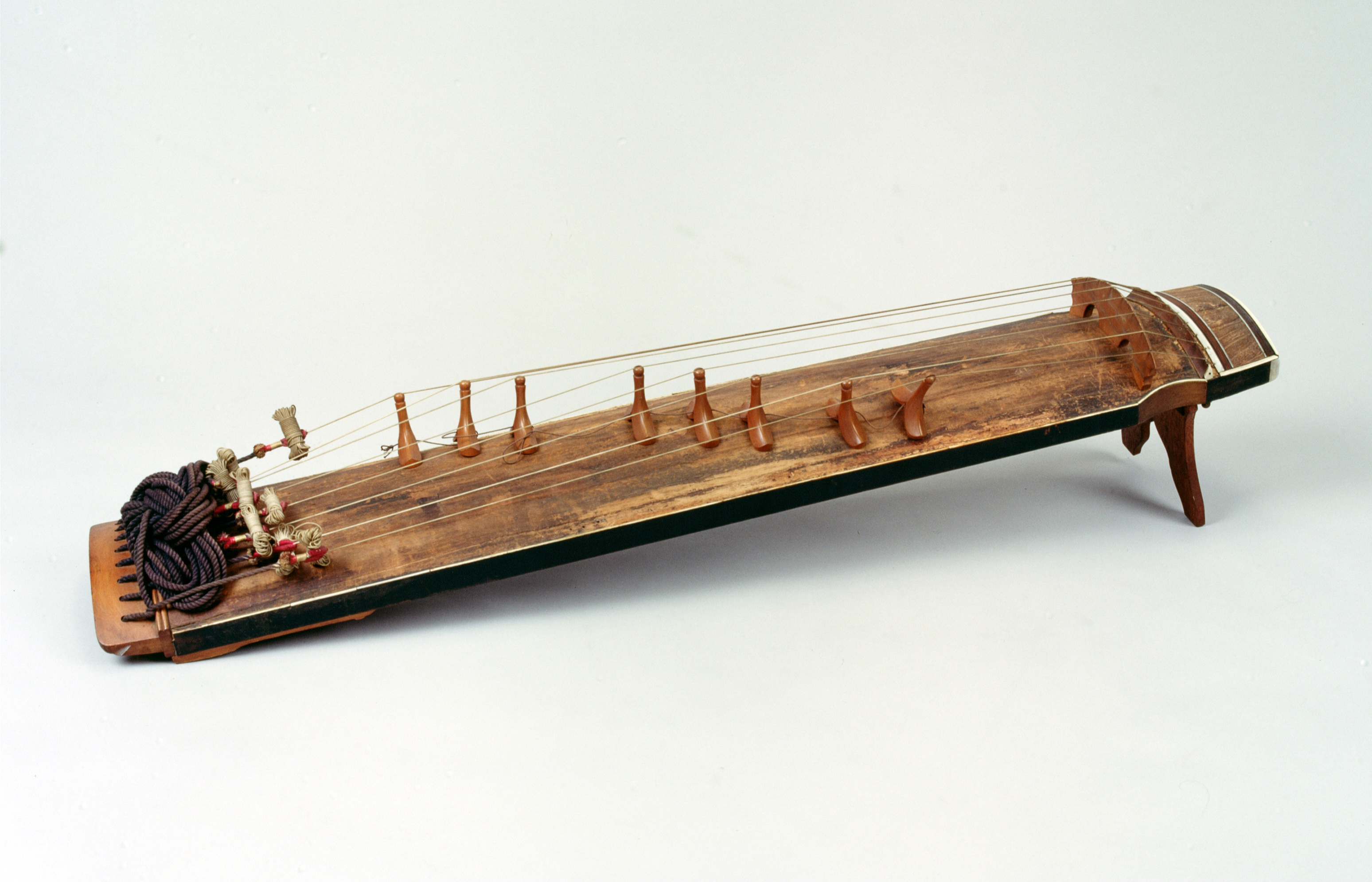
- Classification: Bowed string instruments

Related instruments
- Bowed psaltery; Cello; Crwth; Double bass; Yazheng (China)

- Ajaeng
- Hangul: 아쟁
- Hanja: 牙箏
- RR: ajaeng
- MR: ajaeng

The ajaeng (Korean: 아쟁; Hanja: 牙箏) is a Korean string instrument. It is a wide zither with strings of twisted silk. It is played with a slender stick of forsythia wood that is drawn across the strings in the manner of a bow. The ajaeng mainly plays the bass part in ensemble music. Some instruments have as many as nine to twelve strings. It is similar to the Japanese koto, but is bowed rather than plucked.

The ajaeng is generally played while seated on the floor. It has a tone similar to that of a cello, but raspier. Some contemporary players prefer to use an actual horsehair bow rather than a stick, believing the sound to be smoother. The instrument is used in court, aristocratic, and folk music, as well as in contemporary classical music and film scores.

The traditional ajaeng is divided into a daeajaeng (Korean: 대아쟁; Hanja: 大牙箏) for jeongak (정악; 正樂) and a soajaeng for folk music (小牙箏, or sanjo ajaeng, 散調牙箏). Since the second half of the 20th century, various improved ajaengs have been made and used to play various ranges.

== Description ==
Ajaeng is divided into two types. The ajaeng used in court music is called jeongak ajaeng, and the ajaeng used in folk music is called sanjo ajaeng. The original version of the instrument, and that used in court music (called the jeongak ajaeng), has seven strings; while the ajaeng used for sanjo and sinawi (called the sanjo ajaeng) has eight.

Types of ajaeng

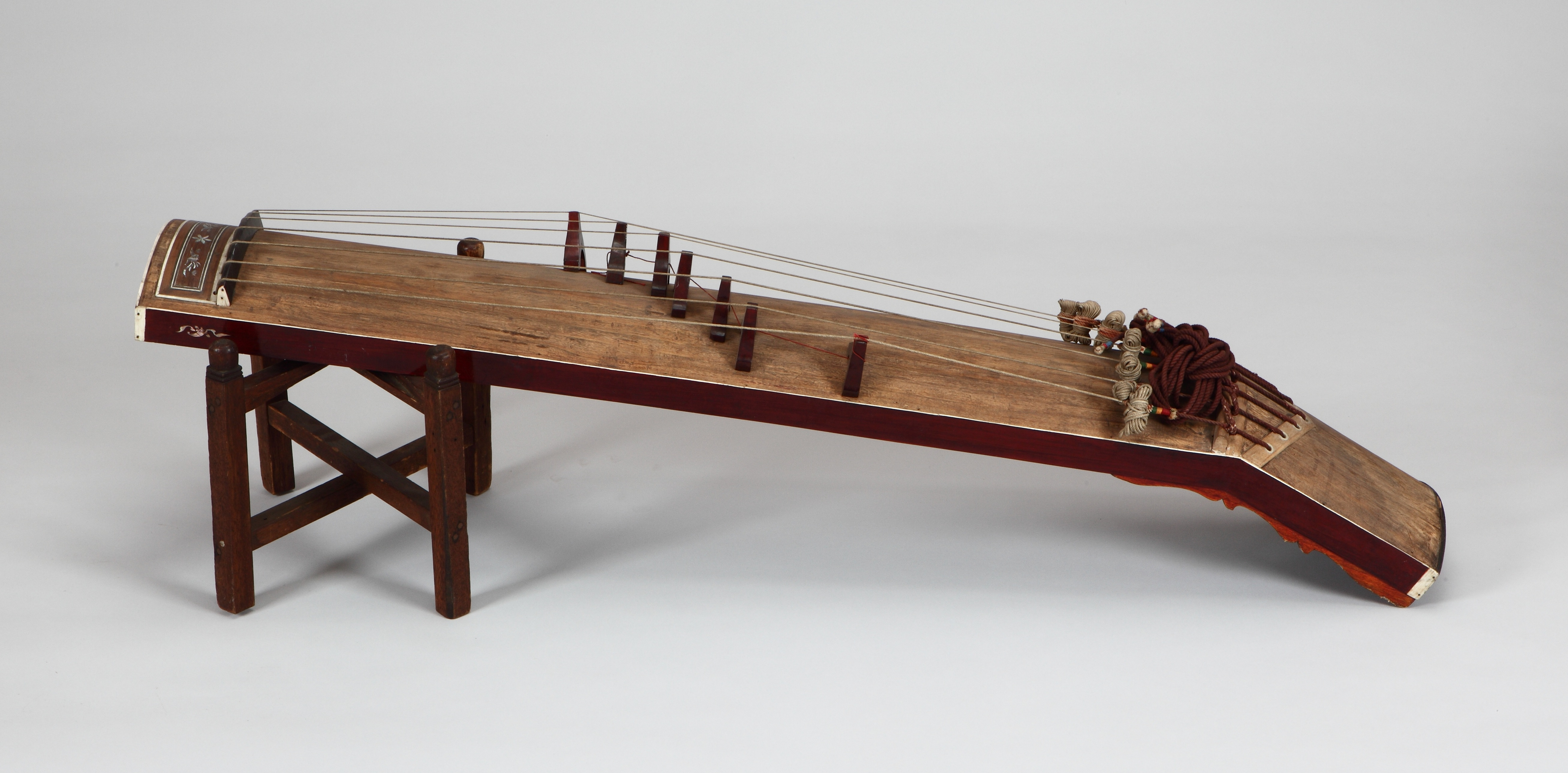
Jeongak ajaeng

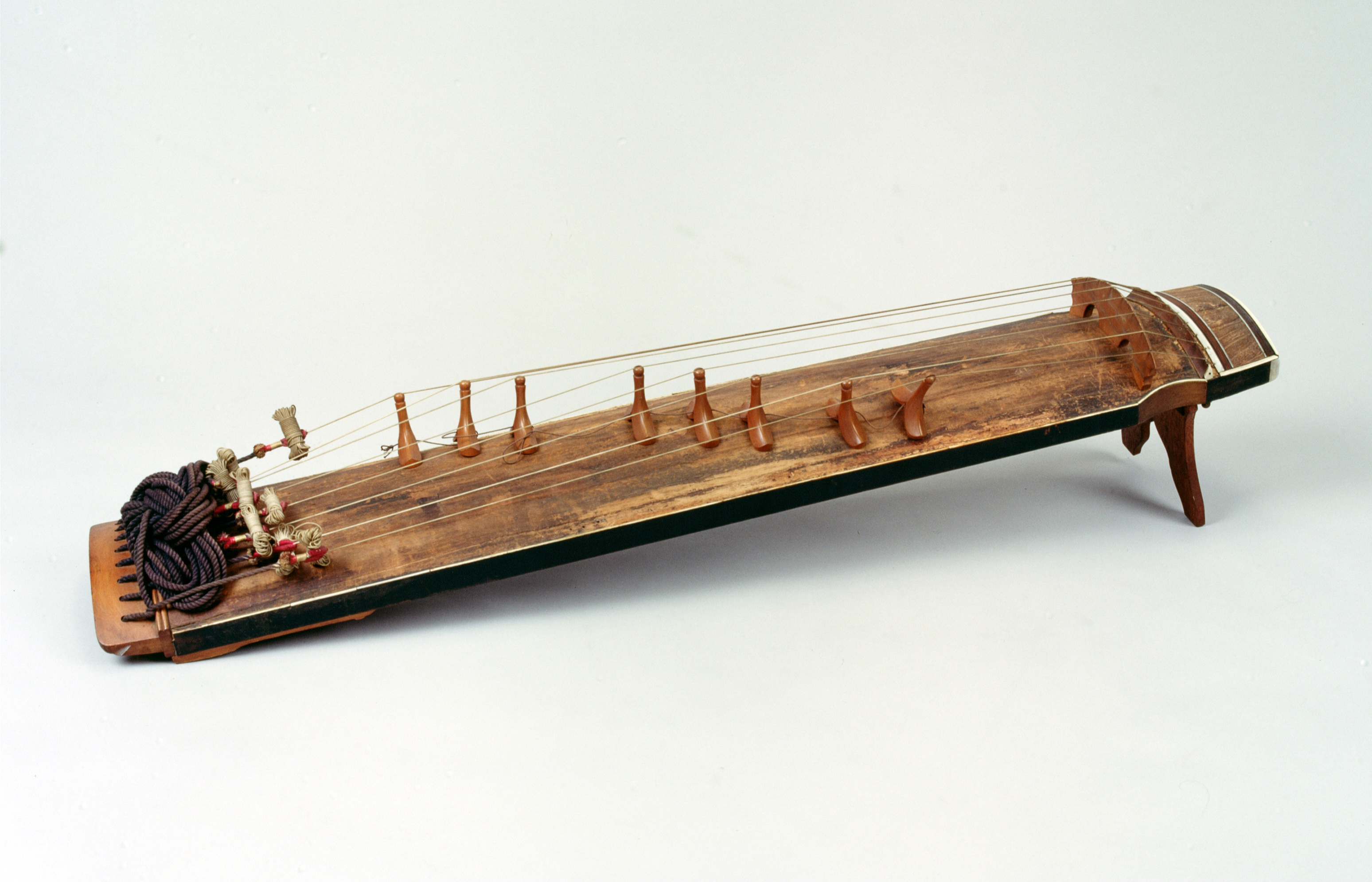
Sanjo ajaeng

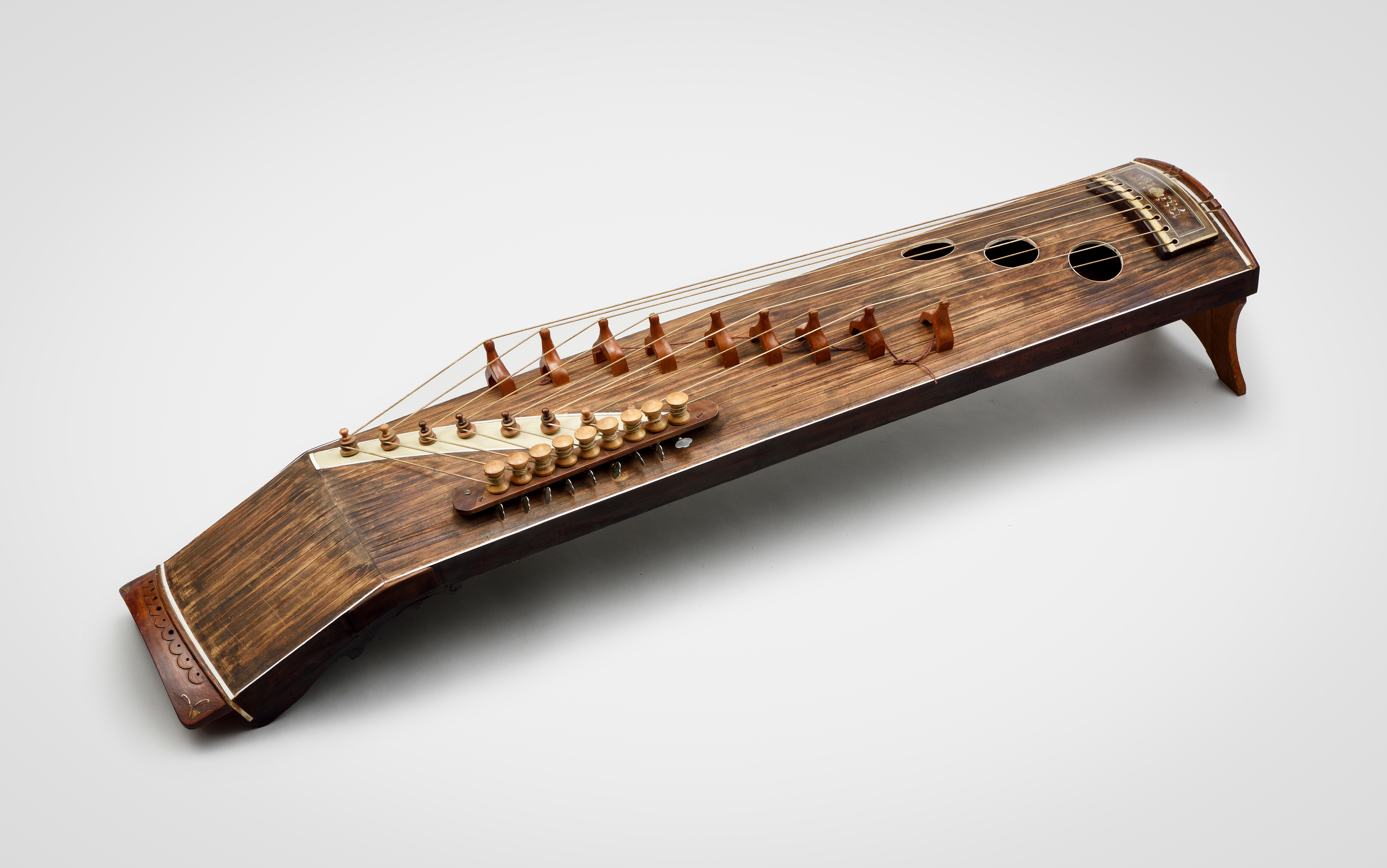
Improved ajaeng

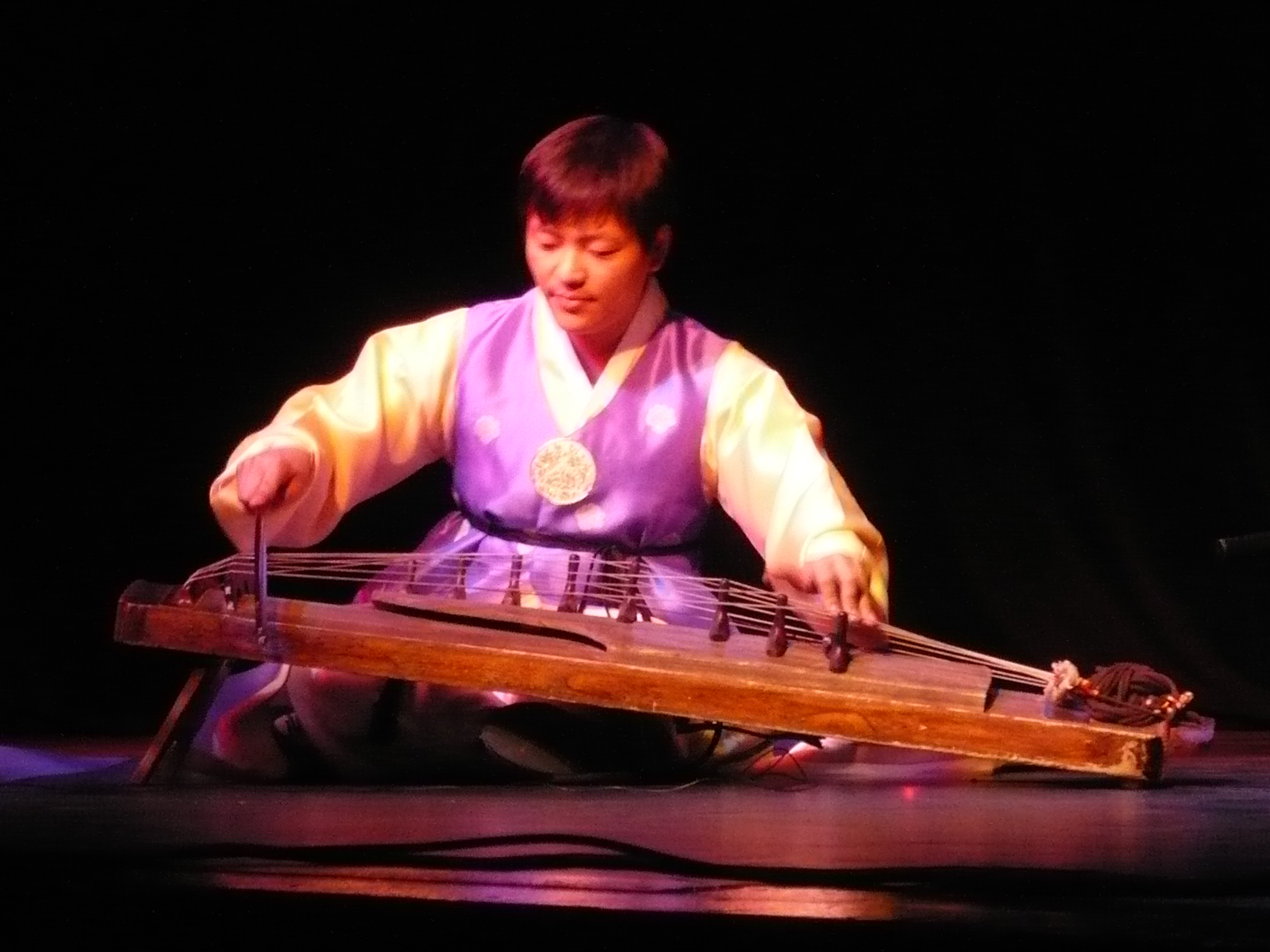
Bowed the ajaeng

The instrument is put on a pedestal called a chosang (초상; 草床). The player plays the instrument using a bow or by plucking the strings.

The ajaeng, having its origins in Tang dynasty China, was derived from the Chinese yazheng, which was introduced to Korea during the Goryeo dynasty.

In 1430, Uiryesangjeongso, the organization for the arrangement of court music and ceremonies arranged the institution of the Goryeo dynasty and included the ajaeng as one of the instruments used to perform Dangak. On the 'Five manners' in the annals of King Sejong, it describes the appearance of the ajaeng. The line was seven, and the left was broken, with catters placed on it.

According to Akhak gwebeom, the ajaeng was used only for Dangak before that time, but at the time of King Seongjong, it was also used for Hyangak.

== See also ==
- Traditional Korean musical instruments
- Korean music
- Yazheng
