= Limbe (instrument) =

Type of flute

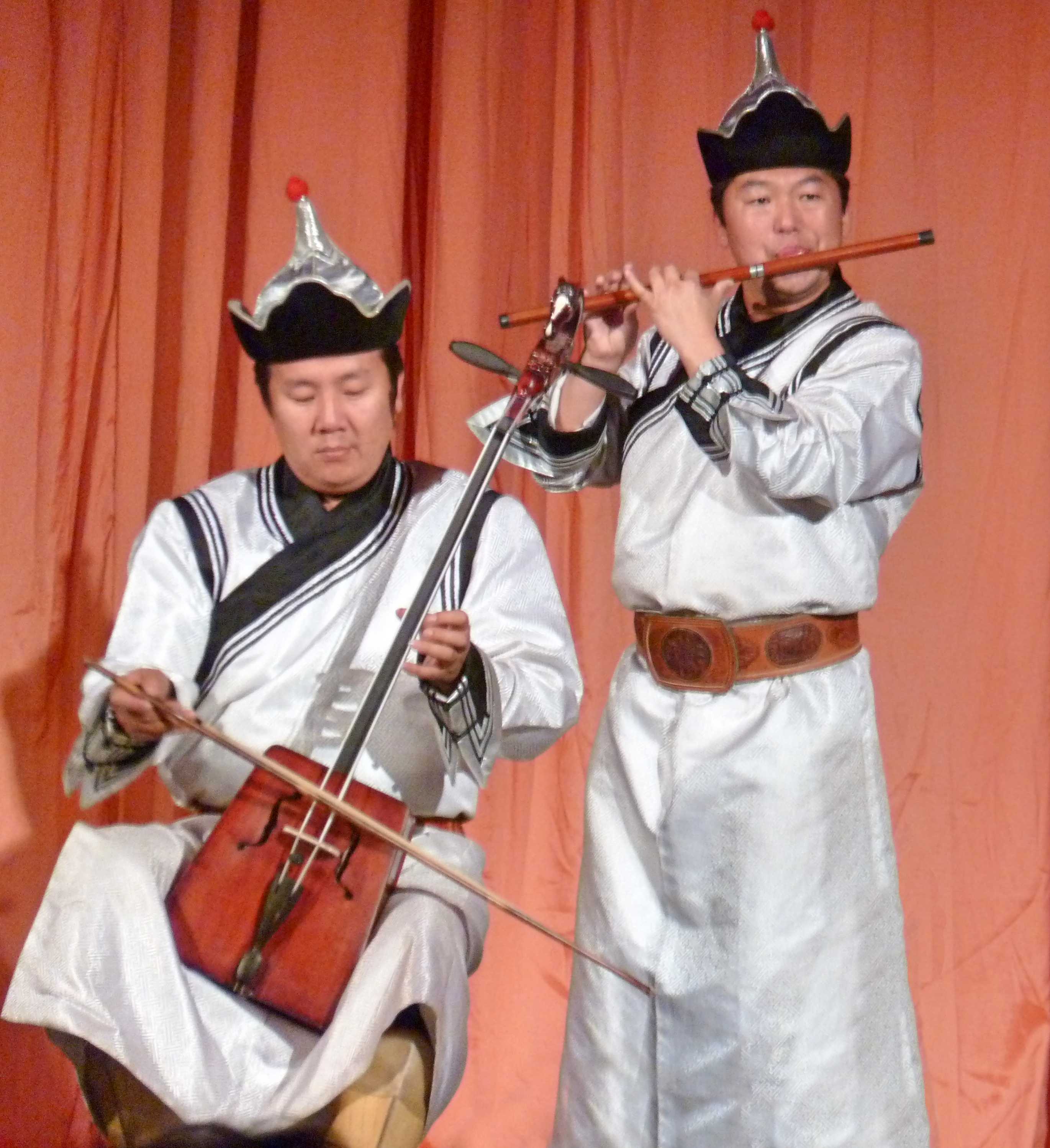
- Limbe and a horse-head fiddle morin khuur. Concert with three horse-head violins, a flute and a singer at the Mongolian State Academic Theatre of Opera and Ballet, 2011

Woodwind instrument
- Classification: Aerophone
- Hornbostel–Sachs classification: 421.121.12 (Open side-blown flutes with fingerholes)

Related instruments
- Dizi; Dangjeok; Daegeum; Minteki

The limbe (Mongolian: лимбэ,ᠯᠢᠩᠪᠦ) is a transverse flute with six finger holes from Mongolian folk music, which belongs to the nomadic pastoral culture and is usually played with circular breathing by experienced players. The continuous playing of the flute to accompany "long songs" (urtin duu) lasting up to 25 minutes was added to the UNESCO Intangible Cultural Heritage Lists in urgent need of preservation in 2011. Like most other Mongolian musical instruments, the limbe is traditionally only allowed to be played by men. The origin of the East Asian flutes such as the limbe and the related dizi in China could be traced back to the 1st millennium BC.

== Origin and distribution ==
The earliest flutes found in China include one that dates back to the Neolithic period around 6000 BC. A bone flute with seven finger holes from Wuyang County dated to the 5th millennium BC and other bone flutes with finger holes from the 5th millennium BC. BC, which probably served as an animal call. They were probably collectively called guan ("tube") in Chinese. Since the 1st millennium, guan has also referred to reed instruments. According to pictographs from the late Shang dynasty (around 1200 BC), yue stood for a panpipe. Clay vessel flutes from the 5th millennium BC. 500 BC, now known as xun, were excavated in Banpo, Shaanxi. Transverse flutes from this early period (up to around 2000 BC) are only known from written Chinese sources. Its old name is chi.

According to these sources, the chi was a ritually used transverse flute with a large inner diameter. Two bamboo flutes, probably corresponding to the chi, with five finger holes, a blowing opening offset by 90 degrees and about 30 centimeters long were discovered in the Tomb of Marquis Yi of Zeng (after 433 BC). These are the oldest finds of transverse flutes. After all, they refute the popular view that the transverse flute was only brought from Central Asia to China during the Han dynasty (207 BC - 220 AD). During this period, the transverse flute was known in China as hengchui ("cross-blown") and was used by military orchestras for outdoor music. In the transverse flute of the Han dynasty, which was probably imported, the blowing hole and finger holes were in one line - as is usual with today's transverse flutes. From the 6th century onwards, the Chinese transverse flute spread under the name hengdi ("transverse flute") and was incorporated into the entertainment orchestras at the imperial court and into general Chinese music during the Tang dynasty (618–907).

Together with the Chang (konghou in China), the barbat (pipa) and the sorna (suona), the transverse flute was mentioned in Chinese sources of the 1st millennium as a musical instrument imported from the West. The historical work Sanguozhi, written by the Chinese historian Chen Shou (233–297) around 285 AD, shows that the transverse flute was a foreign musical instrument and was used in the 2nd century BC, and it was introduced from the "Western Country". The "Western Country" meant roughly the area from Xinjiang through Central Asia to Afghanistan and northern India.

Transverse flutes were unknown in Mesopotamia and Ancient Egypt, but were rare in Ancient Greece. The Greco-Roman plagiaulos ("cross-standing aulos") has been around since the 4th century BC at the latest. Like the longitudinal flute, it was a typical shepherd's instrument, was used as a call for hunting and for cultic purposes, such as the Egyptian Isis cult, but was of little importance for musical life overall. Apart from the plagiaulos, no other transverse flutes are known from the Mediterranean region from the first centuries before and after Christianity. This makes the Indian transverse flutes the oldest, so that according to Jeremy Montagu (2013) it is obvious that the transverse flute spread from India westwards towards Europe.

The above-mentioned finds of Chinese bamboo flutes in the margrave's grave probably have their origin in the local region, otherwise it is possible that the Central and East Asian transverse flutes also come from India, where they appeared in the ancient Indian Sanskrit literature of the 1st millennium BC. It is mentioned in the north as vamsha ("bamboo"). In southern India at the beginning of the 1st millennium AD, the transverse flute was known as kuzhal. Today's bamboo flutes such as bansuri and bansi are derived from the name vamsha. According to this hypothesis, the transverse flute made its way from India to China and further to Japan, where it was documented in the 8th century at the latest and is now available in several variants (such as ryūteki, komabue, yokobue, shinobue and nōkan).

It is unclear when transverse flutes first appeared in Central Asia. According to Chinese sources, they were widespread in Central Asia at the time of the Han dynasty, as it is said that a Chinese embassy brought the flute and knowledge of how to play it back home from Central Asia. A well-known Chinese musician of the 2nd century BC. With this knowledge, he is said to have composed 28 new war melodies.

During excavations in Afrasiyab near Samarkand, fragments of preserved terracotta figures of women playing music from the middle of the 1st millennium came to light. The Sogdian musicians, standing upright, grasp a long, thin wind instrument with both hands, which they hold vertically downwards and which is apparently intended to represent a rim-blown longitudinal flute. Other figures from Afrasiyab played flutes. It is particularly from such representations that we can gain insight into the form and use of the transverse flutes, as only a few original musical instruments have survived. On several terracotta depictions from Afrasiyab, what can be seen is a blowing tube attached to the side at a right angle on the transverse flutes, as was also typical of the Greco-Roman plagiaulos. Original examples of this type of flute were also unearthed. According to this, transverse flutes were widespread in Samarkand in the 1st millennium and were played by women and men.

A gilded silver bowl from Bactria dated to the 7th century shows mythological figures from Greek-Buddhist culture in relief, including a bearded Heracles. However, the monkeys playing music on the edge of the bowl are not part of ancient Greek art. One monkey beats a double-headed hourglass drum, the other blows a transverse flute that he holds with both hands. The number of finger holes is not visible; the playing tube appears somewhat shorter and thicker than on today's flutes. The oldest musical monkeys were excavated by the Sumerians (mid-3rd millennium BC), and here they suggest contact with Indian art.

Sogdia was influenced by Buddhism until the 8th century. Further north, in East Turkestan, numerous musical monkeys and, above all, important wall paintings have also been preserved from the Buddhist art of Central Asia. Murals depicting Buddhist paradises usually feature festively dressed musicians accompanying dancers in their midst. The musicians in one of the oldest Buddhist representations of paradise, a wall painting in cave 220 of the Mogao Caves near Dunhuang from the Tang dynasty, play different lutes, angle harp (tschang), board zither (cf. current), cone oboe (suona), pan flute, transverse flute, snail trumpet, mouth organ, chime (bianqing) and drums.

The limbe is preferred by Eastern Mongolian ethnic groups, which include the Khalkha Mongols. The old Mongolian name bischgüür for longitudinal and transverse flutes today refers to the Mongolian cone oboe, which is related to the suona. Bischgüür, in Classical Mongolian biskigür or bisigür, is possibly derived from Persian bīscha or pīscha for a shepherd's flute made of plant cane. In addition to the Chinese dizi, transverse flutes corresponding to the limbe are the bamboo flute limba of the Buryats in Eastern Siberia, the lingbu in Tibetan music and the zur-lim in Bhutan. Lingbu, also known as gling-bu in Tibetan, refers to all Tibetan flute types and in the narrower sense a core gap flute. In particular, the Tibetan transverse flute with six or seven finger holes is called phred-gling or ti-gling and is only used in light music. Other flutes called lingbu are used in the Tibetan ritual dance ling dro (also gling-bro), performed by laypeople, together with the secular cone oboe sona (practically identical in construction to the sacred gyaling).

In southern Central Asia, the brass flute tulak is also known in Herat, western Afghanistan, and the nai flute is known in the music of Tajikistan and Uzbekistan (among the Karakalpaks). The nai is closely related to the Chinese dizi and the limbe, which is belied by the Arabic-Persian name adopted from the longitudinal flute nay. Roger Blench (2019) suspects that the name nai is a later adoption after the Islamization of the region in order to enhance the flute through a reference to Arab-Muslim culture.

== Design ==
The limbe is made of bamboo or brass, the modern one is often made of plastic. It has twelve holes: the first for blowing, the second - covered with a membrane - amplifies the sound, the next six are opened or closed with the player's fingers, the remaining four holes: two in the upper part and two in the lower part, when they remain covered, give the instrument a lower sound.

Eastern Khalkhas distinguish two forms of limbe, the female limbe which is narrower, and the male limbe, which is thicker and shorter.

== Playing style and techniques ==
Individual ethnic groups maintain different identities with their own musical expressions. In general, instrumental music is secondary to the various forms of unaccompanied vocal music. The limbe is a musical instrument well suited for nomads because it is small and can be easily transported when slipped into the belt.

Traditionally, the limbe is played by shepherds in the pasture. The transverse flute has a special meaning when it is used as an alternative to the morin khuur in a ritual that is intended to get a mother camel to accept her own rejected or another's young. Camels usually give birth to a foal every two years. Due to the harsh climatic conditions, it can happen that the mother or the young do not survive the birth and the orphaned foal has to be adopted by another mother without offspring. In this case, the Mongolians practice a ritual at dawn or dusk in which they tie the mother and foal together and a singer begins to call "chuus, chuus, chuus…". Those present dressed in their best clothes to reflect the significance of the ritual. Accompanied by a musician with a horse-head violin or transverse flute, the shepherdess and singer (or a professional singer hired for this purpose) standing close to the camel performs a melody with excerpts from poetic verses that imitate the camel's stride and its cries. During the ritual, which lasts several hours, the melody is adapted to the changing behavior of the mother animal. This “camel appeasement ritual” was added to the list of intangible cultural heritage in urgent need of preservation by UNESCO in 2015. The successful ritual ensures the survival of the foal and provides camel milk during the nursing period, which nomads living in the Gobi Desert need for their nutrition.
