= Traditional Japanese musical instruments =

Aspect of Japanese music

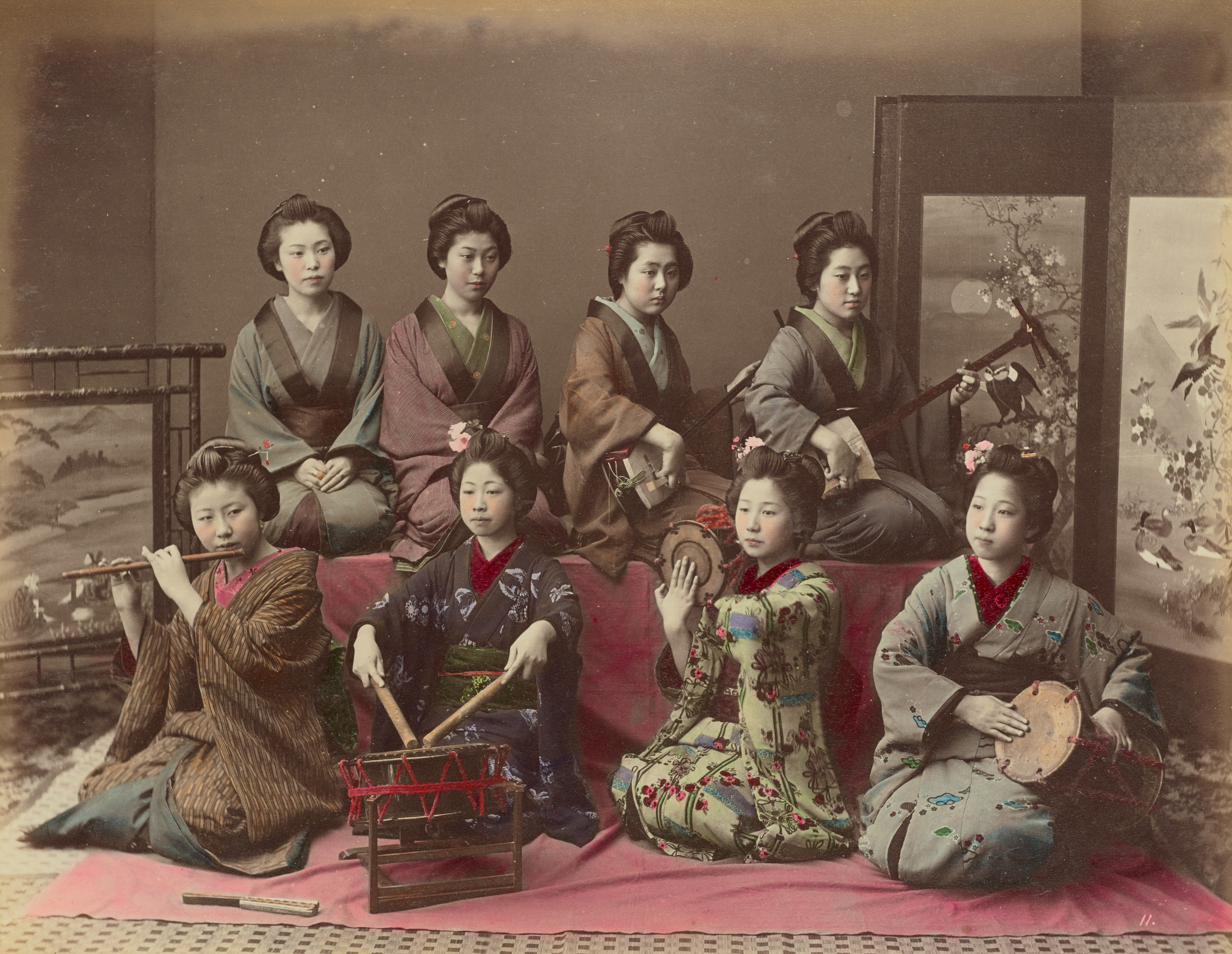
Women playing the Shamisen, Tsuzumi, and Taiko in Meiji-era Japan.

Traditional Japanese musical instruments, known as wagakki (和楽器) in Japanese, are musical instruments used in the traditional folk music of Japan. They comprise a range of string, wind, and percussion instruments.

== Percussion instruments ==
- Bin-sasara (編木、板ささら); also spelled bin-zasara – clapper made from wooden slats connected by a rope or cord
- Chappa (— チャッパ) – Hand cymbals
- Hyoshigi (拍子木) – wooden or bamboo clappers
- Denden-daiko (でんでん太鼓) – a children's toy
- Ikko – small, ornately decorated hourglass-shaped drum
- Kagura suzu – hand-held bell tree with three tiers of pellet bells
- Kakko (羯鼓) – small drum used in gagaku
- Kane (鉦) – small flat gong
- Kokiriko (筑子、 こきりこ) – a pair of sticks which are beaten together slowly and rhythmically
- Shakubyoshi (also called shaku) – clapper made from a pair of flat wooden sticks
- Mokugyo (木魚; also called 'wooden fish') – woodblock carved in the shape of a fish, struck with a wooden stick; often used in Buddhist chanting
- Ōtsuzumi (大鼓) – hand drum
- Rin or daikin (大磬) – singing bowls used by Buddhist monks in religious practice or rituals
- San-no-tsuzumi (三の鼓) – hourglass-shaped double-headed drum; struck only on one side
- Sasara (ささら) – clapper made from wooden slats connected by a rope or cord
- Sekkin – a lithophone either bowed or struck
- Shime-daiko (締太鼓) – small drum played with sticks
- Shōko (鉦鼓) – small bronze gong used in gagaku; struck with two horn beaters
- Taiko (太鼓, lit. 'great drum')
- Tsuri-daiko (釣太鼓) – drum on a stand with ornately painted head, played with a padded stick
- Tsuzumi (鼓) – small hand drum

== String instruments ==
=== Plucked ===
==== Zithers ====
- Ichigenkin (一絃琴) – monochord
- Junanagen (十七絃) – the 17-string koto
- Koto (琴、箏) – a long zither
- Yamatogoto (大和琴) – ancient long zither; also called wagon (和琴)

==== Harps ====
- Kugo (箜篌) – an angled harp used in ancient times and recently revived
- Taishōgoto (大正琴) – a zither with metal strings and keys

==== Lutes ====
- Biwa – a pear-shaped lute

==== Other ====
- Gottan or hako-jamisen
- Sanshin (三線, lit. 'three strings') – an Okinawan precursor of the mainland Japanese (and Amami Islands) shamisen
- Shamisen (三味線) – a banjo-like lute with three strings; brought to Japan from China in the 16th century. Popular in Edo's pleasure districts, the shamisen is often used in kabuki theater. Made from red sandalwood and ranging from 1.1 to 1.4 metres (3 ft 7 in to 4 ft 7 in) long, the shamisen has ivory pegs, strings made from twisted silk, and a belly covered in cat or dog skin or a synthetic skin. (Note: Though animal skin was used in previous decades—as recently as the 1970s—due to a decline in its production, synthetic skins, which are considered to provide a generally equal sound quality, are typically used in the modern day. During its period of common use, cat skin was used for finer instruments, and dog skin was used for practice instruments.) The strings, which are of different thickness, are plucked or struck with a tortoise shell, ivory or synthetic ivory pick.
- Tonkori (トンコリ) – a plucked instrument used by the Ainu people of Hokkaidō

=== Bowed ===
- Kokyū – a bowed lute with three (or, more rarely, four) strings and a skin-covered body

== Wind instruments ==
=== Flutes ===
Japanese flutes are called fue (笛). There are eight traditional flutes, as well as more modern creations.

- Hocchiku (法竹) – vertical bamboo flute
- Nohkan (能管) – transverse bamboo flute used for Noh theater
- Ryūteki (龍笛) – transverse bamboo flute used for gagaku
- Kagurabue (神楽笛) – transverse bamboo flute used for mi-kagura (御神楽), Shinto ritual music)
- Komabue (高麗笛) – transverse bamboo flute used for komagaku; similar to the ryūteki
- Shakuhachi (尺八) – vertical bamboo flute used for Zen meditation
- Shinobue (篠笛) – transverse folk bamboo flute
- Tsuchibue (土笛(つちぶえ), lit. 'earthen flute') – globular flute made from clay
- Bow flute (弓笛) – a flute developed by Ishida Nehito with bow hair on it to accompany the kokyū

=== Reed instruments ===
- Hichiriki (篳篥) – double-reeded flute used in different kinds of music

=== Free reed mouth organs ===
- Shō (笙) – 17-pipe mouth organ used for gagaku
- U (竽) – large mouth organ

=== Horns ===
- Horagai (法螺貝) – seashell horn; also called jinkai (陣貝)

== Other instruments ==
- Mukkuri (ムックリ) – jaw harp used by the Ainu people
- Koukin (口琴) – general name for the jaw harp, also known as the biyabon (びやぼん) in the Edo period

== See also ==
- Music of Japan

== Bibliography ==
- Gunji, Sumi; Johnson, Henry (2012). A Dictionary of Traditional Japanese Musical Instruments: From Prehistory to the Edo Period. Tokyo: Eideru Kenkyūjo. ISBN 978-4-87168-513-9..
