= Flute =

Woodwind instrument

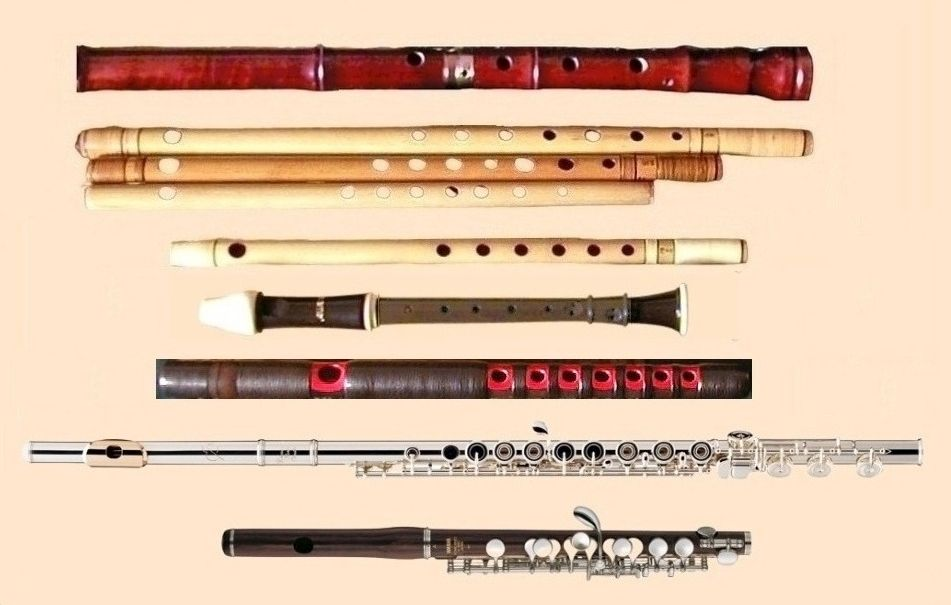
Shinobue and other flutes

The flute is a member of a family of musical instruments in the woodwind group. Like all woodwinds, flutes are aerophones, producing sound with a vibrating column of air. Flutes produce sound when the player's air flows across an opening. In the Hornbostel–Sachs classification system, flutes are edge-blown aerophones. A musician who plays the flute is called a flautist or flutist.

Paleolithic flutes with hand-bored holes are the earliest known identifiable musical instruments. A number of flutes dating to about 53,000 to 45,000 years ago have been found in the Swabian Jura region of present-day Germany, indicating a developed musical tradition from the earliest period of modern human presence in Europe. While the oldest flutes currently known were found in Europe, Asia also has a long history with the instrument. A playable bone flute discovered in China is dated to about 9,000 years ago. The Americas also had an ancient flute culture, with instruments found in Caral, Peru, dating back 5,000 years and in Labrador dating back about 7,500 years.

The bamboo flute has a long history, especially in China and India. Flutes have been discovered in historical records and artworks starting in the Zhou dynasty (c.1046–256 BC). The oldest written sources reveal the Chinese were using the kuan (a reed instrument) and xīao (an end-blown flute, often of bamboo) in the 12th–11th centuries BC, followed by the chi (or ch'ih) in the 9th century BC and the yüeh in the 8th century BC. Of these, the bamboo chi is the oldest documented transverse flute.

Musicologist Curt Sachs called the cross flute (Sanskrit: vāṃśī) "the outstanding wind instrument of ancient India", and said that religious artwork depicting "celestial music" instruments was linked to music with an "aristocratic character". The Indian bamboo cross flute, Bansuri, was sacred to Krishna, who is depicted with the instrument in Hindu art. In India, the cross flute appeared in reliefs from the 1st century AD at Sanchi and Amaravati from the 2nd–4th centuries AD.

According to historian Alexander Buchner, there were flutes in Europe in prehistoric times, but they disappeared from the continent until flutes arrived from Asia by way of "North Africa, Hungary, and Bohemia". The end-blown flute began to be seen in illustration in the 11th century. Transverse flutes entered Europe through Byzantium and were depicted in Greek art about 800 AD. The transverse flute had spread into Europe by way of Germany, and was known as the German flute.

== Etymology and terminology ==
The word flute first appeared in the English language during the Middle English period, as floute, flowte, or flo(y)te, possibly from Old French flaute and Old Provençal flaüt, or possibly from Old French fleüte, flaüte, flahute via Middle High German floite or Dutch fluit. The English verb flout has the same linguistic root, and the modern Dutch verb fluiten still shares the two meanings. Attempts to trace the word back to the Latin flare (to blow, inflate) have been called "phonologically impossible" or "inadmissable". The first known use of the word flute was in the 14th century. According to the Oxford English Dictionary, this was in Geoffrey Chaucer's The Hous of Fame, c. 1380.

A musician who plays any instrument in the flute family can be called a flutist, flautist, or flute player. Flutist dates back to at least 1603, the earliest quotation cited by the Oxford English Dictionary. Flautist was used in 1860 by Nathaniel Hawthorne in The Marble Faun, after being adopted during the 18th century from Italy (flautista, itself from flauto), like many musical terms in England since the Italian Renaissance. Other English terms, now virtually obsolete, are fluter (15th–19th centuries) and flutenist (17th and 18th centuries).

== History ==
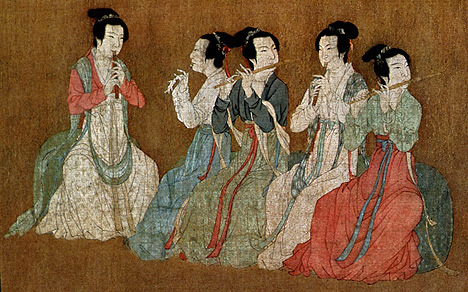
Chinese women playing flutes, from the 12th-century Song dynasty remake of the Night Revels of Han Xizai, originally by Gu Hongzhong (10th century)

A fragment of a juvenile cave bear's femur, with two to four holes, was found at Divje Babe in Slovenia and dated to about 43,000 years ago. It may be the oldest flute discovered, but this has been disputed. In 2008, a flute dated to at least 35,000 years ago was discovered in Hohle Fels cave near Ulm, Germany. It is a five-holed flute with a V-shaped mouthpiece and was made from a vulture wing bone. The discovery was published in the journal Nature, in August 2009. This was the oldest confirmed musical instrument ever found, until a redating of flutes found in Geißenklösterle cave revealed them to be older, at 42,000 to 43,000 years.

The Hohle Fels flute is one of several found in the Hohle Fels cavern next to the Venus of Hohle Fels and a short distance from the oldest known human carving. On announcing the discovery, scientists suggested that the "finds demonstrate the presence of a well-established musical tradition at the time when modern humans colonized Europe". Scientists have also suggested that this flute's discovery may help to explain "the probable behavioural and cognitive gulf between" Neanderthals and early modern human.

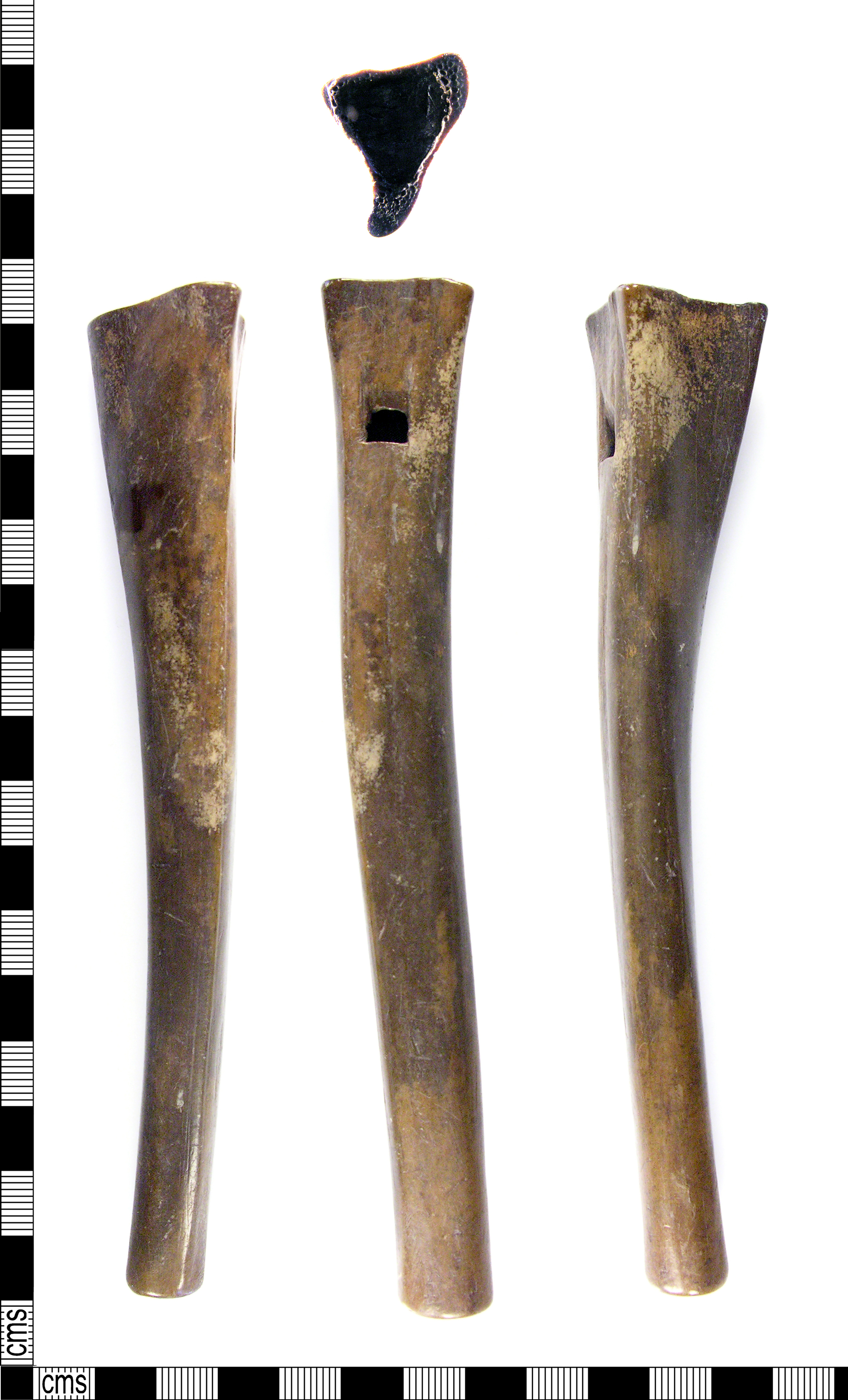
Bone flute made of a goat's tibia, 11th–13th century AD.

An 18.7 cm flute with three holes, made from a mammoth tusk and dated to 30,000–37,000 years ago, was found in 2004 in the Geißenklösterle cave near Ulm, in the southern German Swabian Alb. Two flutes made from swan bones were excavated a decade earlier from the same cave and dated to about 36,000 years ago.

A playable 9,000-year-old Chinese Gudi (literally, "bone flute") was excavated from a tomb in Jiahu along with 29 similar specimens. They were made from the wing bones of red-crowned cranes and each has five to eight holes. The earliest extant Chinese transverse flute is a chi (篪) flute discovered in the Tomb of Marquis Yi of Zeng at the Suizhou site, Hubei province, China, dating from 433 BC, during the later Zhou dynasty. It is fashioned of lacquered bamboo with closed ends and has five stops on the flute's side instead of the top. Shi Jing, traditionally said to have been compiled and edited by Confucius, mentions chi flutes.

The earliest written reference to a flute is from a Sumerian-language cuneiform tablet dated to c. 2600–2700 BC. Flutes are mentioned in a recently translated tablet of the Epic of Gilgamesh, an epic poem whose development spanned the period from about 2100–600 BC. A set of cuneiform tablets knows as the "musical texts" provide precise tuning instructions for seven scales of a stringed instrument (assumed to be a Babylonian lyre). One of those scales is named "embūbum", which is an Akkadian word for "flute".

The Bible, in Genesis 4:21, cites Jubal as being the "father of all those who play the ugab and the kinnor". The former Hebrew term is believed by some to refer to a wind instrument, or wind instruments in general, the latter to a stringed instrument, or stringed instruments in general. As such, Jubal is regarded in the Judeo-Christian tradition as the inventor of the flute (a word used in some translations of this biblical passage). In other sections of the Bible (1 Samuel 10:5, 1 Kings 1:40, Isaiah 5:12 and 30:29, and Jeremiah 48:36) the flute is referred to as "chalil", from the root word for "hollow". Archeological digs in the Holy Land have discovered flutes from the Bronze Age (c. 4000–1200 BC) and the Iron Age (1200 – 586 BC), the latter era "witness[ing] the creation of the Israelite kingdom and its separation into the two kingdoms of Israel and Judea."

Some early flutes were made out of tibias (shin bones). The flute has also always been an essential part of Indian culture, and the cross flute believed by several accounts to originate in India as Indian literature from 1500 BC has made vague references to the cross flute.

== Acoustics ==
A flute produces sound when a stream of air directed across a hole in the instrument creates a vibration of air at the hole. The airstream creates a Bernoulli or siphon. This excites the air contained in the resonant cavity (usually cylindrical) within the flute. The flutist changes the pitch of the sound produced by opening and closing holes in the body of the instrument, thus changing the effective length of the resonator and its corresponding resonant frequency. By varying the air pressure, a flutist can also change the pitch by causing the air in the flute to resonate at a harmonic rather than the fundamental frequency without opening or closing any of the holes.

Head joint geometry appears particularly critical to acoustic performance and tone, but there is no clear consensus among manufacturers on a particular shape. Acoustic impedance of the embouchure hole appears the most critical parameter. Critical variables affecting this acoustic impedance include: the length of the chimney (the hole between the lip-plate and the head tube), chimney diameter, and radii or curvature of the ends of the chimney and any designed restriction in the "throat" of the instrument, such as that in the Japanese Nohkan flute.

A study in which professional flutists were blindfolded could find no significant differences between flutes made from a variety of metals. In two different sets of blind listening, no flute was correctly identified in a first listening, and in a second, only the silver flute was identified. The study concluded that there was "no evidence that the wall material has any appreciable effect on the sound color or dynamic range".

== Materials ==
Historically, flutes were most commonly made of reed, bamboo, wood, or other organic materials. They were also made of glass, bone, and nephrite. Most modern flutes are made of metal, primarily silver and nickel. Silver is less common than silver alloys. Other materials used for flutes include gold, platinum, grenadilla and copper.

== Types ==
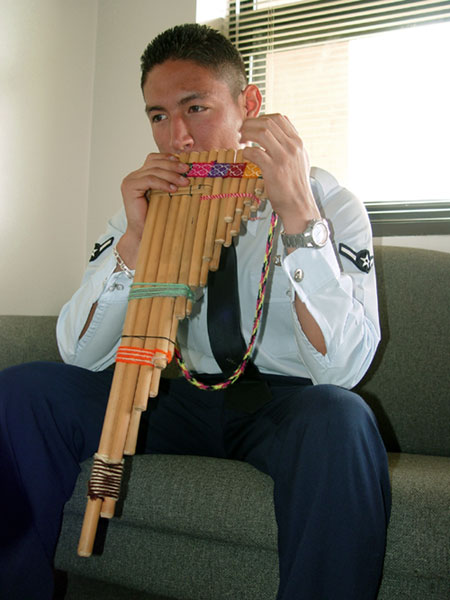
Playing the zampoña, a Pre-Inca instrument and type of pan flute.

In its most basic form, a flute is an open tube which is blown into. After focused study and training, players use controlled air-direction to create an airstream in which the air is aimed downward into the tone hole of the flute's headjoint. There are several broad classes of flutes. With most flutes, the musician blows directly across the edge of the mouthpiece, with 1/4 of their bottom lip covering the embouchure hole. However, some flutes, such as the whistle, gemshorn, flageolet, recorder, tin whistle, tonette, fujara, and ocarina have a duct that directs the air onto the edge (an arrangement that is termed a "fipple"). These are known as fipple flutes. The fipple gives the instrument a distinct timbre which is different from non-fipple flutes and makes the instrument easier to play, but takes a degree of control away from the musician.

Another division is between side-blown (or transverse) flutes, such as the Western concert flute, piccolo, fife, dizi and bansuri; and end-blown flutes, such as the ney, xiao, kaval, danso, shakuhachi, Anasazi flute and quena. The player of a side-blown flute uses a hole on the side of the tube to produce a tone, instead of blowing on an end of the tube. End-blown flutes should not be confused with fipple flutes such as the recorder, which are also played vertically but have an internal duct to direct the air flow across the edge of the tone hole.

Flutes may be open at one or both ends. The ocarina, xun, pan pipes, police whistle, and bosun's whistle are closed-ended. Open-ended flutes such as the concert flute and the recorder have more harmonics, and thus more flexibility for the player, and brighter timbres. An organ pipe may be either open or closed, depending on the sound desired.

Flutes may have any number of pipes or tubes, though one is the most common number. Flutes with multiple resonators may be played one resonator at a time (as is typical with pan pipes) or more than one at a time (as is typical with double flutes).

Flutes can be played with several different air sources. Conventional flutes are blown with the mouth, although some cultures use nose flutes. The flue pipes of organs, which are acoustically similar to duct flutes, are blown by bellows or fans.

=== Western transverse ===
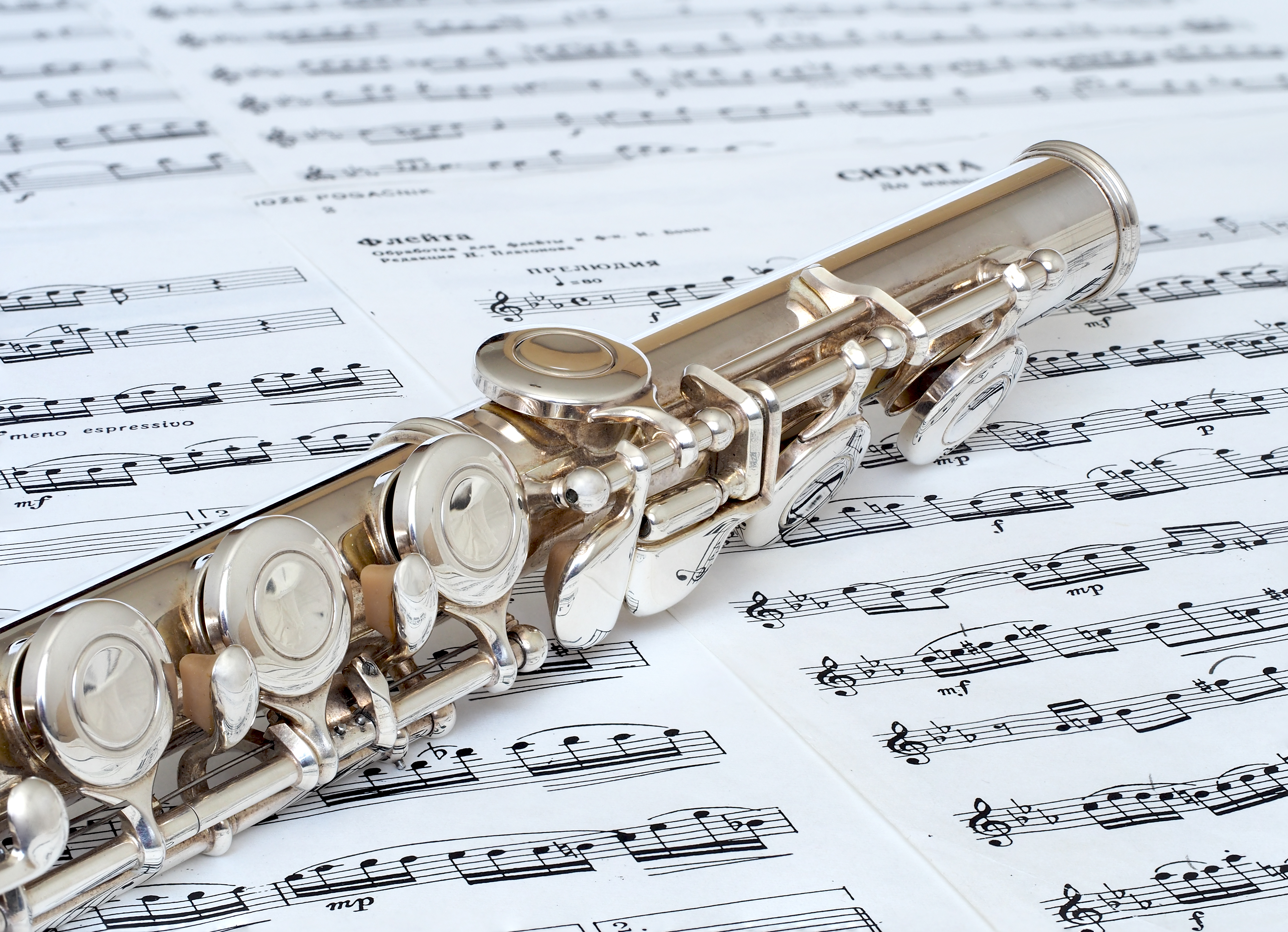
Western concert flute

==== Wooden one-keyed ====
Usually starting from d1, wooden transverse flutes were played in European classical music mainly in the period from the early 18th century to the early 19th century. As such, the instrument is often indicated as baroque flute. Gradually marginalized by the Western concert flute in the 19th century, baroque flutes were again played from the late 20th century as part of the historically informed performance practice.

==== Concert ====
An illustration of a Western concert flute

The Western concert flute, a descendant of the medieval German flute, is a transverse treble flute that is closed at the top. An embouchure hole is positioned near the top, and the flutist blows across it. The flute has circular tone holes larger than the finger holes of its baroque predecessors. The size and placement of tone holes, key mechanism, and fingering system used to produce the notes in the flute's range were evolved from 1832 to 1847 by Theobald Boehm, who helped greatly improve the instrument's dynamic range and intonation over its predecessors. With some refinements (and the rare exception of the Kingma system and other custom adapted fingering systems), Western concert flutes typically conform to Boehm's design, known as the Boehm system. Beginner's flutes are made of nickel, silver, or brass that is silver-plated, while professionals use solid silver, gold, and sometimes even platinum flutes. There are also modern wooden-bodied flutes usually with silver or gold keywork. The wood is usually African Blackwood.

The standard concert flute is pitched in C and has a range of three octaves starting from middle C or one half step lower when a B foot is attached. This means that the concert flute is one of the highest-pitched common orchestra and concert band instruments.

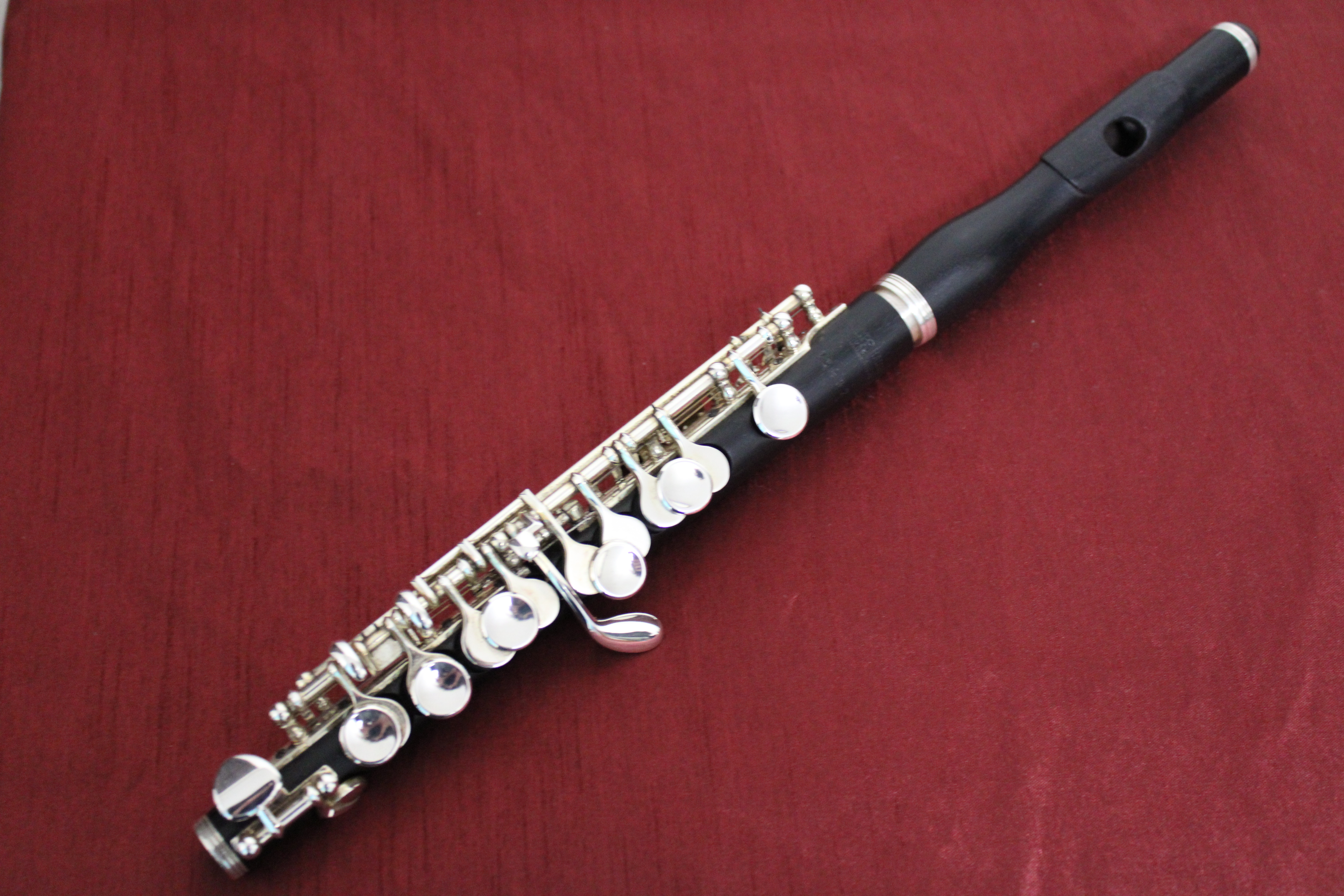
Grenadilla wood piccolo with a modified wave headjoint

==== Concert variants ====
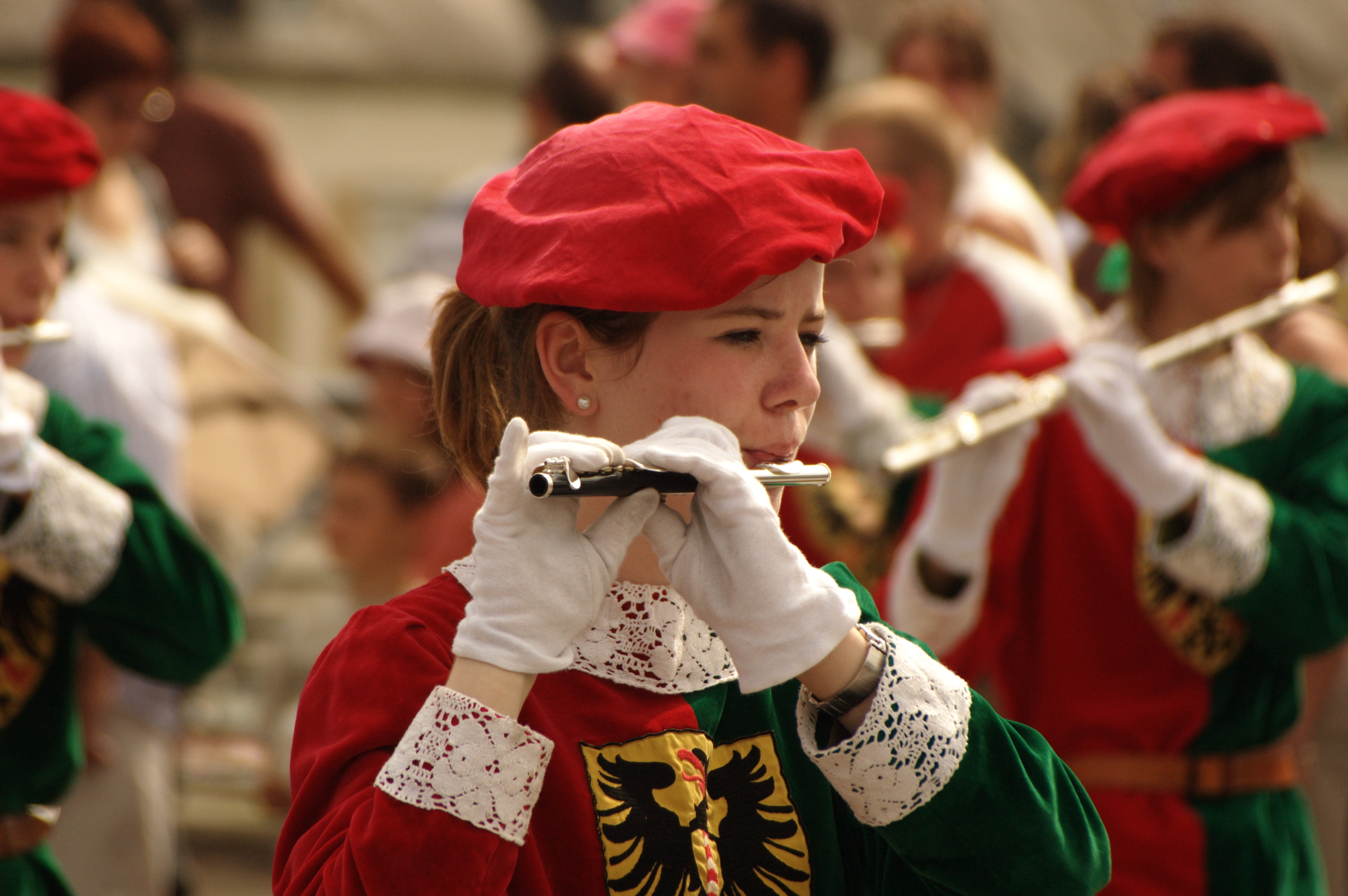
Center: Piccolo. Right: larger flute

The piccolo plays an octave higher than the regular treble flute. Lower members of the flute family include the G alto and C bass flutes that are used occasionally, and are pitched a perfect fourth and an octave below the concert flute, respectively. The contra-alto, contrabass, subcontrabass, double contrabass, and hyperbass flutes are other rare forms of the flute pitched up to four octaves below middle C.

Other sizes of flutes and piccolos are used from time to time. A rarer instrument of the modern pitching system is the G treble flute. Instruments made according to an older pitch standard, used principally in wind-band music, include D♭ piccolo, E♭ soprano flute (Keyed a minor 3rd above the standard C flute), F alto flute, and B♭ bass flute.

=== Indian ===
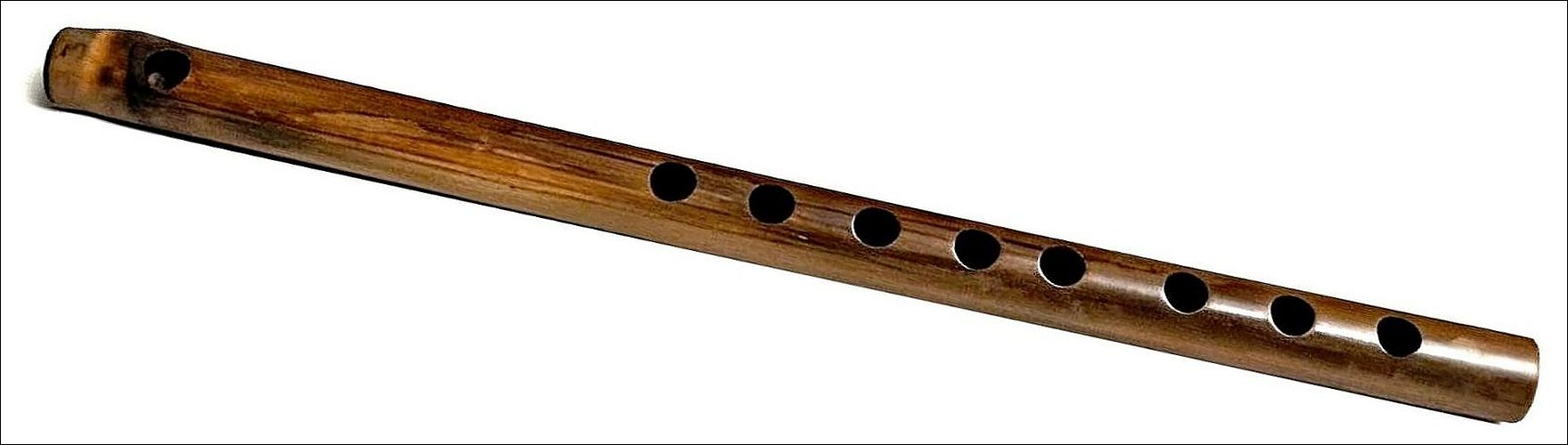
A Carnatic eight-holed bamboo flute

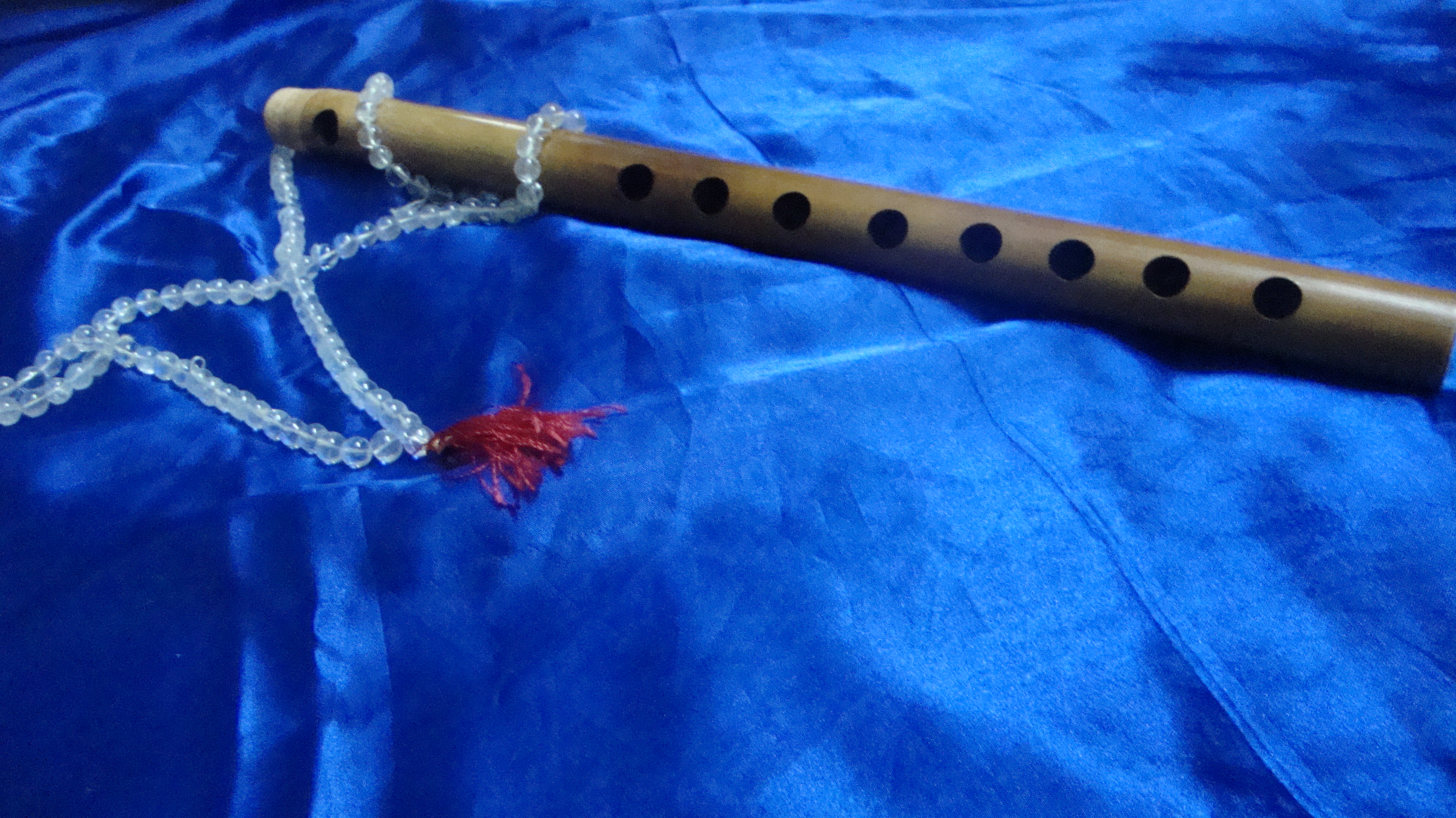
An eight-holed classical Indian bamboo flute.

The bamboo flute is an important instrument in Indian classical music, and developed independently of the Western flute. The Hindu God Lord Krishna is traditionally considered a master of the bamboo flute. The Indian flutes are very simple compared to the Western counterparts; they are made of bamboo and are keyless.

Two main varieties of Indian flutes are currently used. The first, the Bansuri (बांसुरी), has six finger holes and one embouchure hole, and is used predominantly in the Hindustani music of Northern India. The second, the Venu or Pullanguzhal, has eight finger holes, and is played predominantly in the Carnatic music of Southern India. Presently, the eight-holed flute with cross-fingering technique is common among many Carnatic flutists. Prior to this, the South Indian flute had only seven finger holes, with the fingering standard developed by Sharaba Shastri, of the Palladam school, at the beginning of the 20th century.

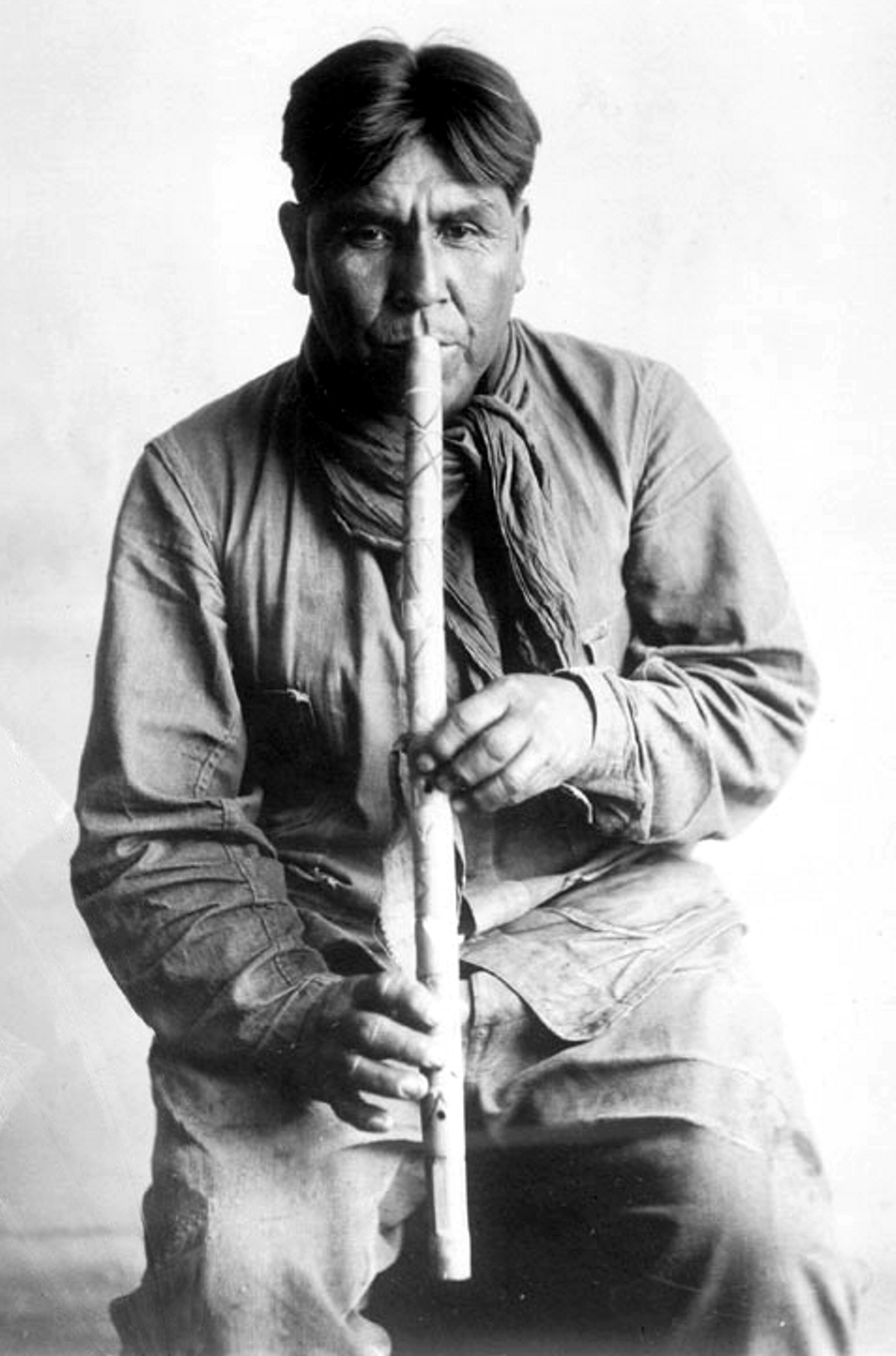
Cipriano Garcia playing a flute of the Tohono O'odham culture. Photograph by Frances Densmore taken in 1919.

The quality of the flute's sound depends somewhat on the specific bamboo used to make it, and it is generally agreed that the best bamboo grows in the Nagercoil area of South India.

In 1998 Bharata Natya Shastra Sarana Chatushtai, Avinash Balkrishna Patwardhan developed a methodology to produce perfectly tuned flutes for the ten 'thatas' currently present in Indian Classical Music.

In a regional dialect of Gujarati, a flute is also called Pavo. Some people can also play pair of flutes (Jodiyo Pavo) simultaneously.

=== Chinese ===
In China there are many varieties of dizi (笛子), or Chinese flute, with different sizes, structures (with or without a resonance membrane) and number of holes (from 6 to 11) and intonations (different keys). Most are made of bamboo, but can come in wood, jade, bone, and iron. One peculiar feature of the Chinese flute is the use of a resonance membrane mounted on one of the holes that vibrates with the air column inside the tube. This membrane is called a di mo, which is usually a thin tissue paper. It gives the flute a bright sound.

Commonly seen flutes in the modern Chinese orchestra are the bangdi (梆笛), qudi (曲笛), xindi (新笛), and dadi (大笛). The bamboo flute played vertically is called the xiao (簫), which is a different category of wind instrument in China.

=== Korean ===
The Korean flute, called the daegeum, 대금, is a large bamboo transverse flute used in traditional Korean music. It has a buzzing membrane that gives it a unique timbre.

=== Japanese ===
The Japanese flute, called the fue, 笛 (hiragana: ふえ), encompasses a large number of musical flutes from Japan, include the end-blown shakuhachi and hotchiku, as well as the transverse gakubue, komabue, ryūteki, nōkan, shinobue, kagurabue and minteki.

=== Sodina and suling ===
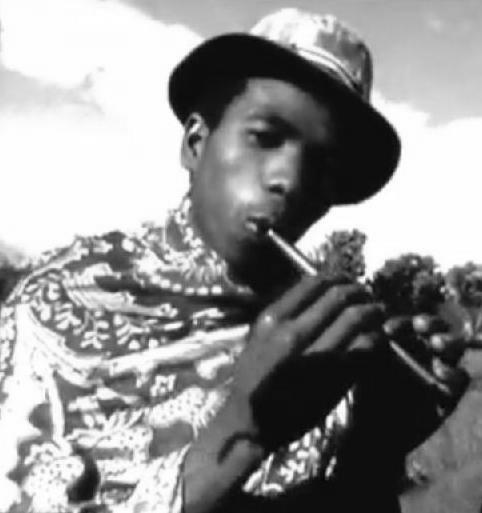
A sodina player in Madagascar

The sodina is an end-blown flute found throughout the island state of Madagascar, located in the Indian Ocean off southeastern Africa. One of the oldest instruments on the island, it bears close resemblance to end-blown flutes found in Southeast Asia and particularly Indonesia, where it is known as the suling, suggesting the predecessor to the sodina was carried to Madagascar in outrigger canoes by the island's original settlers emigrating from Borneo. An image of the most celebrated contemporary sodina flutist, Rakoto Frah (d. 2001), was featured on the local currency.

=== Sring ===
The sring (also called blul) is a relatively small, end-blown flute with a nasal tone quality found in the Caucasus region of Eastern Armenia. It is made of wood or cane, usually with seven finger holes and one thumb hole, producing a diatonic scale. One Armenian musicologist believes the sring to be the most characteristic of national Armenian instruments.

=== Ọjà ===
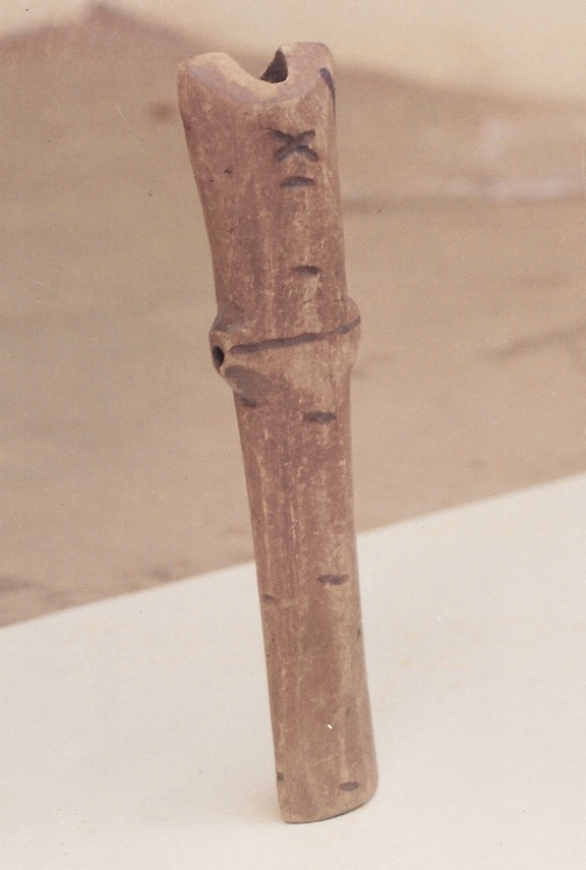
The Ọjà, which is a traditional Igbo flute

The Ọjà // is a traditional musical instrument utilized by the Igbo people, who are indigenous to Nigeria. The ọjà (flute) is used during cultural activities or events where Igbo music is played. It is skillfully carved from wood/bamboo or metal and is played by blowing air into one end while covering and uncovering holes along the body to create different notes.

== Breathing techniques ==
There are several means by which flautists breathe to blow air through the instrument and produce sound. They include diaphragmatic breathing and circular breathing. Diaphragmatic breathing optimizes inhalation, minimizing the number of breaths. Circular breathing brings air in through the nose and out through the mouth, enabling a continuous sound.

== See also ==
- Diple – Woodwind musical instrument
- Flute method – Textbook-style method of learning to play the flute
- Frula – Musical instrument
- Hand flute – Hand-based musical instrument
- Irish flute – Musical instrument
- Jazz flute – Use of the flute in jazz music
- List of flautists
- Native American flute – Native American musical instrument
- Palendag – Philippine bamboo flute
- Pipe (instrument) – Simple wooden flute
- Pipe and tabor – Pair of instruments
- Recorder (musical instrument) – Woodwind instrument
- Vessel flute – Vessel-shaped flute
- Washint – Wind instrument developed in Ethiopia

== Bibliography ==
- Buchanan, Donna A. 2001. "Bulgaria §II: Traditional Music, 2: Characteristics of Pre-Socialist Musical Culture, 1800–1944, (iii): Instruments". The New Grove Dictionary of Music and Musicians, second edition, edited by Stanley Sadie and John Tyrrell. London: Macmillan Publishers.
- Crane, Frederick. 1972. Extant Medieval Musical Instruments: A Provisional Catalogue by Types. Iowa City: University of Iowa Press. ISBN 0-87745-022-6
- Galway, James. 1982. Flute. Yehudi Menuhin Music Guides. London: Macdonald. ISBN 0-356-04711-3 (cloth); ISBN 0-356-04712-1 (pbk.) New York: Schirmer Books. ISBN 0-02-871380-X Reprinted 1990, London: Kahn & Averill London: Khan & Averill ISBN 1-871082-13-7
- Loewy, Andrea Kapell. 1990. "Frederick the Great: Flutist and composer". College Music Symposium 30 (1): 117–125. JSTOR 40374049. The famous Prussian king (1712–1786) was a composer and patron of music.
- Phelan, James, 2004. The complete guide to the flute and piccolo: From acoustics and construction to repair and maintenance, second edition. [S.l.]: Burkart-Phelan, Inc., 2004. ISBN 0-9703753-0-1
- Putnik, Edwin. 1970. The Art of Flute Playing. Evanston, Illinois: Summy-Birchard Inc. Revised edition 1973, Princeton, New Jersey and Evanston, Illinois. ISBN 0-87487-077-1
- Toff, Nancy. 1985. The Flute Book: A Complete Guide for Students and Performers. New York: Charles's Scribners Sons. ISBN 0-684-18241-6 Newton Abbot: David & Charles. ISBN 0-7153-8771-5 Second Edition 1996, New York: Oxford University Press. ISBN 0-19-510502-8
- Wye, Trevor. 1988. Proper Flute Playing: A Companion to the Practice Books. London: Novello. ISBN 0-7119-8465-4
- Maclagan, Susan J. "A Dictionary for the Modern Flutist", 2009, Lanham, Maryland, USA: Scarecrow Press. ISBN 978-0-8108-6711-6
