= List of musical instruments by Hornbostel–Sachs number: 421 =

Edge-blown aerophones is one of the categories of musical instruments found in the Hornbostel–Sachs system of musical instrument classification. In order to produce sound with these aerophones, the player makes a ribbon-shaped flow of air with their lips (421.1), or their breath is directed through a duct against an edge (421.2).

421.1 Flutes without duct – The player creates a ribbon-shaped stream of air with their lips.

421.11 End-blown flutes – The player blows against the sharp rim at the upper open end of a tube.

421.111 Individual end-blown flutes

421.111.1 Open single end-blown flutes – The lower end of the flute is open.

421.111.11 Without fingerholes.

421.111.12 With fingerholes.

- Anasazi flute
- Danso
- Hotchiku
- Kaval
- Ney
- Nose flute
- Palendag
- Quena
- Shakuhachi
- Sring
- Suling
- Tungso
- Washint
- Xiao

421.111.2 Stopped single end-blown flutes – The lower end of the flute is closed.

421.111.21 Without fingerholes.

421.111.22 With fingerholes.

421.112 Sets of end-blown flutes or panpipes – Several end-blown flutes of different pitch are combined to form a single instrument.

- Diple

421.112.1 Open panpipes.

421.112.11 Open (raft) panpipes – The pipes are tied together in the form of a board, or they are made by drilling tubes *in a board.

421.112.12 Open bundle (pan-) pipes – The pipes are tied together in a round bundle.

421.112.2 Stopped panpipes

- Pan flute
  - Siku

421.112.3 Mixed open and stopped panpipes.

421.12 Side-blown flutes – The player blows against the sharp rim of a hole in the side of the tube.

421.121 (Single) side-blown flutes.

421.121.1 Open side-blown flutes.

421.121.11 Without fingerholes.

421.121.12 With fingerholes

- Bansuri
- Chi
- Daegeum
- Dangjeok
- Dizi
- Fife
- Gakubue
- Kagurabue
- Junggeum
- Komabue
- Koudi
- Limbe (instrument)
- Minteki
- Nohkan
- Ryuteki
- Sáo
- Seiteki
- shinobue
- Sogeum
- Western concert flutes
  - Piccolo
  - Concert flute
  - Alto flute
  - Bass flute
  - Contra-alto flute
  - Contrabass flute
  - Double contrabass flute
  - Hyperbass flute

421.121.2 Partly stopped side-blown flutes - The lower end of the tube is a natural node of the pipe pierced by a small hole.

421.121.3 Stopped side-blown flutes.

421.121.31 Without fingerholes.

421.121.311 With fixed stopped lower end - (Apparently non-existent).

421.121.312 With adjustable stopped lower end

421.121.32 With fingerholes.

421.122 Sets of side-blown flutes.

421.122.1 Sets of open side-blown flutes.

- Paidi

421.122.2 Sets of stopped side-blown flutes.

421.13 Vessel flutes (without distinct beak) The body of the pipe is not tubular but vessel-shaped.

- Jug

421.2 Flutes with duct or duct flutes - A narrow duct directs the air-stream against the sharp edge of a lateral orifice

421.21 Flutes with external duct - The duct is outside the wall of the flute; this group includes flutes with the duct chamfered in the wall under a ring-like sleeve and other similar arrangements.

421.211 (Single) flutes with external duct.

421.211.1 Open flutes with external duct.

421.211.11 Without fingerholes.

421.211.12 With fingerholes.

- Native American flute

421.211.2 Partly stopped flutes with external duct.

421.211.3 Stopped flutes with external duct.

- Boatswain's call

421.212 Sets of flute with external duct.

421.22 Flutes with internal duct - The duct is inside the tube. This group includes flutes with the duct formed by an internal baffle (natural node, bock of resin) and an exterior tied-on cover (cane, wood, hide).

421.221 (Single) flutes with internal duct.

421.221.1 Open flutes with internal duct.

421.221.11 Without fingerholes.

421.221.12 With fingerholes.

- Atenben
- Flageolet
- Fujara
- Khloy
- Khlui
- Recorder
- Tin whistle
- Tonette

421.221.2 Partly stopped flute with internal duct.

421.221.3 Stopped flutes with internal duct.

- whistle

421.221.31 Without fingerholes.

421.221.311 With fixed stopped lower end.

421.221.312 With adjustable stopped lower end.

- Slide whistle

421.221.4 Vessel flutes with duct.

421.221.41 Without fingerholes

421.221.42 With fingerholes

- Gemshorn
- Ocarina

421.222 Sets of flutes with internal duct.

421.222.1 Sets of open flutes with internal duct.

421.222.11 Without fingerholes - Open flue stops of the organ.

421.222.12 With fingerholes

- Double flageolet.

421.222.2 Sets of partly stopped flutes with internal duct.

421.222.3 Sets of stopped flutes with internal duct.

- Paixiao
