= Sring =

Musical instrument

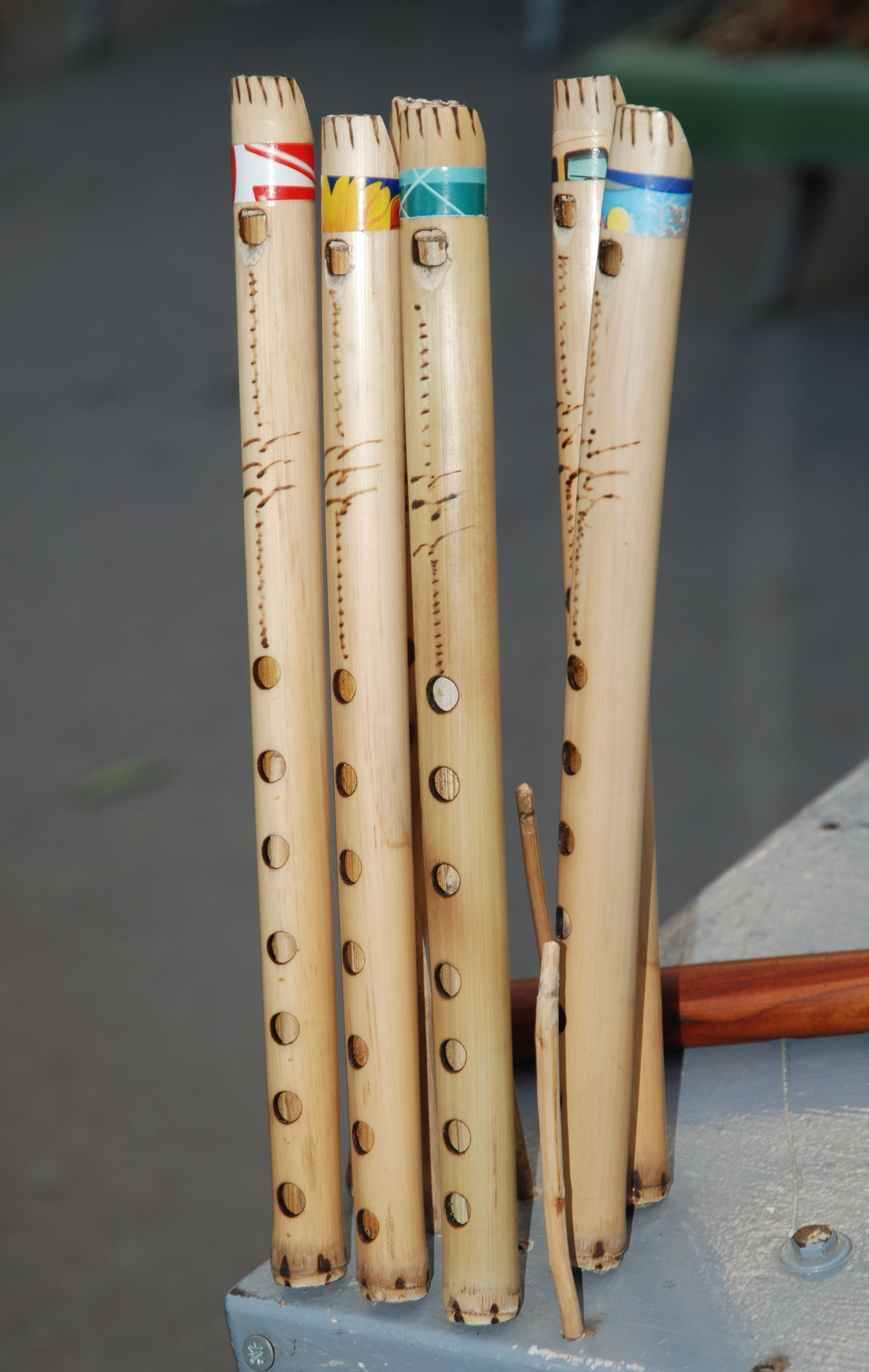
- Other names: սրինգ, srink
- Classification: Woodwind Instrument

Related instruments
- Atenteben (Ghana); Bansuri (India); Chi (China); Dizi (China); Daegeum (Korea); Dangjeok (Korea); Danso (Korea); Dongdi (China); Hocchiku (Japan); Jeok (Korea); Ji (Korea); Junggeum (Korea); Kagurabue (Japan); Khloy (Cambodia); Khlui (Thailand); Komabue (Japan); Koudi (China); Native American flute (United States and Canada); Nohkan (Japan); Ohe Hano Ihu (Polynesia); Paixiao (China); Quena (Andes); Ryūteki (Japan); Sáo (Vietnam); Shakuhachi (Japan); Shinobue (Japan); Siku (Andes); So (Korea); Sogeum (Korea); Suling (Indonesia); Tongso (Korea); Xiao (China); Xindi (China); Yak (Korea); Yokobue (Japan); Yue (China)

More articles or information
- Armenian music

The sring (Armenian: սրինգ, also transliterated as srink) is a shepherd's flute originating in Armenia. Sring is also the common term for end-blown flutes in general. These flutes are made either of a stork bone, bamboo, wood from the apricot tree or cane and have or eight finger holes, producing a diatonic scale. The Armenian musicologist Komitas believed that the sring was the most characteristic among the Armenian instruments.

== Blul ==
The blul instrument is a particular variety of the sring family of flutes. It is often considered a modern evolution of the medieval sring, with the primary differences being the presence of ring-shaped zones, both ends being thickened, and the resulting sound being characterized as velvety and slightly muted.
