= Bamboo flute =

Type of musical instrument

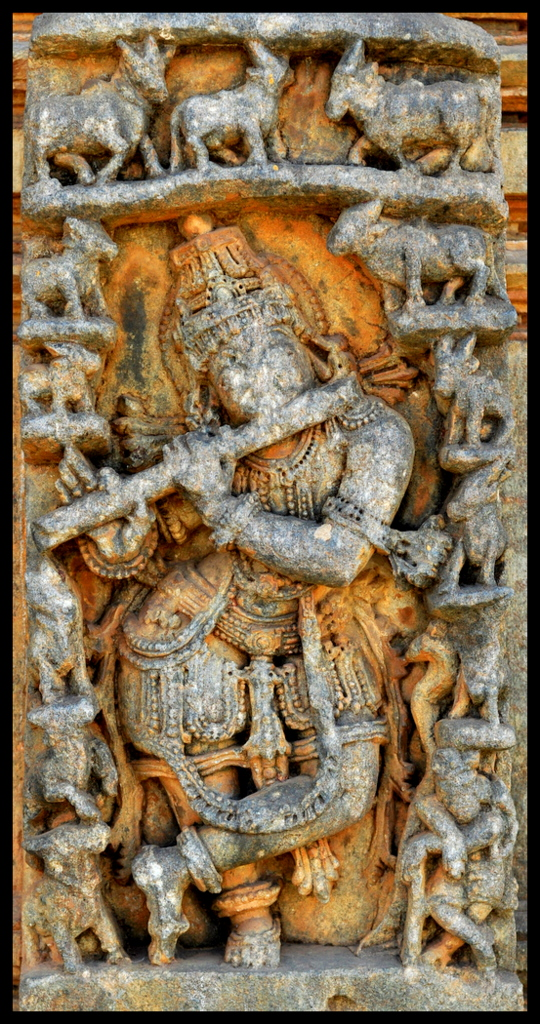
- Krishna playing flute with his herd of cows in Bucesvara Temple, Koravangala. 12th century.

Woodwind instrument
- Classification: woodwind
- Hornbostel–Sachs classification: 421 (421.11 End-blown flutes 421.12 Side-blown flutes)
- Developed: Bamboo flutes spread from China and India, along silk road, and across the oceans to Southeast Asia and Africa. Native Americans also made bamboo flutes.

The bamboo flute is an old musical instrument developed in Asia. Flutes made history in records and artworks starting in the Zhou dynasty. The oldest written sources reveal the Chinese were using the kuan (a reed instrument) and hsio (or xiao, an end-blown flute, often of bamboo) in the 12th-11th centuries b.c., followed by the chi (or ch'ih) in the 9th century b.c. and the yüeh in the 8th century b.c. Of these, the chi is the oldest documented cross flute or transverse flute, and was made from bamboo. The Chinese have a word, zhudi, which literally means "bamboo flute."

The cross flute (Sanscrit: vāṃśī) was "the outstanding wind instrument of ancient India," according to Curt Sachs. He said that religious artwork depicting "celestial music" instruments was linked to music with an "aristocratic character." The Indian bamboo cross flute, Bansuri, was sacred to Krishna, and he is depicted in Hindu art with the instrument. In India, the cross flute appeared in reliefs from the 1st century a.d. at Sanchi and Amaravati from the 2nd-4th centuries a.d.

In the modern age, bamboo flutes are common in places with ready access to bamboo, including Asia, South and Southeast Asia, South America, and Africa.

See: Chinese flutes

== End blown flute mouthpieces ==
| Name | Description | Picture |
|---|---|---|
| Xiao blowing hole | (the hole faces away from the player, against the lower lip, making sure the top lip is not concealing the hole, when the instrument is played. Works on the same basics as blowing air over an empty bottle to create noise.) | |
| Shakuhachi | Kinko school utaguchi (歌口, blowing edge) and inlay. The shakuhachi player blows as one would blow across the top of an empty bottle (though the shakuhachi has a sharp edge to blow against called utaguchi) and therefore has substantial pitch control. | |
| Hotchiku | Same technique as shakuhachi. The angle of the utaguchi (歌口, lit. "singing mouth"), or blowing edge, of a hotchiku is closer to perpendicular to the bore axis than that of a modern shakuhachi. | |
| Quena | To produce sound, the player closes the top end of the pipe with the flesh between the chin and lower lip, and blows a stream of air downward, along the axis of the pipe, over an elliptical notch cut into the end. | Blowing tip of Quena flute, South America |
| Khlui | Thailand. A block has been put into the end of the flute, an internal fipple that creates a hole to blow through, channeling air through a duct to create sound. | |

== List of bamboo flutes, cane flutes, reed flutes ==
This list is intended to show flutes made of bamboo. It excludes pan flutes or panpipes, and flutes and whistles that don't have finger positions to change notes. It also excludes pipes that use reeds to produce the sound. Bamboo is a grass, and some "cane" or "reed" flutes may get listed here, as long as the plant is being used for a tube that is blown into or across to create noise. Types of flutes include transverse flutes (also called cross flutes), end-blown flutes (ring flutes are included with these) and Nose flutes. Fipple flutes, also called duct flutes, may be added to the list as well, as long as they are bamboo-based instruments. The bamboo variant may be added for instruments that include wood and bamboo versions.

| Name in English | Name in other language | Place / Region | Picture | Method of sounding | Description |
|---|---|---|---|---|---|
| Atenteben | | Ghana | | | |
| Bansuri | | Bangladesh | A group of bansuri flutes, grouped low pitched to high pitched. | | |
| Bansuri | | India | Musician playing a large bansuri; the larger instrument is lower toned than a smaller bansuri. | | |
| Bām̐surī | (Nepali: बाँसुरी) | Nepal | Public performance by Newar musicians with flutes, Lalitpur. | | |
| Bata Nalawa | | Sri Lanka | | | |
| Chi | | China | | | |
| Dizi | Chinese: 笛子 pinyin: dízi) | China | Group of dizi flutes in different sizes and pitches. | | |
| Daegeum | Korean: 대금 | Korea | | | |
| Dangjeok or Jeok | Korean: 당적; Hanja: 唐笛 | Korea | | Notched flute | |
| Danso | 단소; 短簫 | Korea | | | |
| Donali | دونَلی | Iran | | | |
| Dongdi | | China | | | |
| Fijian nose flute | | Viti Levu | | Nose flute | This nasal flute is made from a section of bamboo, pierced with nine holes. The entire surface is decorated with geometric patterns of different shapes, forming several registers in the vertical direction. To play the flute, a hole must be applied against one nostril while the other is blocked by the fingers. |
| Floghera | Greek: φλογέρα, romanized: floyéra | Greece | Floyera (end blown flute), souravli (duct flute), madoura (clarinet) | rim-blown | End-blown bamboo flute without a fipple, used in Greek folk music. Played by directing a narrow air stream against its sharp, open upper end. It typically has seven finger holes. |
| Friscolettu | | Sicily | | fipple | Seven holes on the front, two in the back |
| Hotchiku | 法竹 | Japan | | | |
| Gasbah | الڨصبة (Egyptian Arabic), Taghanimt (Berber language) | Maghreb | | oblique (bevel is cut on the end of the tube) | Oblique flutes are played with the musician be holding the flute at an angle to the mouth, blowing across a bevel cut in the end. Similar to Ney. |
| Garau-nai | | Uzbekistan, Tajikistan | | | |
| India nose-flute bansuri | | West Bengal | | Fipple | In 1799, artist Frans Balthazar Solvyns depicted an end-blown flute, called Bansuri (like the side-blown flute), being played nasally. |
| Ji | | Korea | | | |
| Junggeum | 중금; 中笒 | Korea | Top a daegeum, in the middle a junggeum, to the right a piri. | | |
| Kagurabue | (Japanese: 神楽笛)) | Japan | | | |
| Khloy | Khmer: ខ្លុយ; Burmese: ပုလွ | Cambodia; Myanmar (Burma) | | internal fipple | end-blown duct flute. Mouthhole on bottom of pipe's end, soundhole on flute's bottom (opposite side of the pipe from the fingerholes). This flute may have as many as 8 fingerholes, plus up to 2 additional thumbholes; the thumbholes offer additional notes. |
| Khlui | (Thai: ขลุ่ย | Thailand | | internal fipple | end-blown duct flute. Mouthhole on top of pipe's end, soundhole on flute's top. |
| Komabue | Japanese: 高麗笛 | Japan | Komabue in the Metropolitan Museum of Arts | | |
| Koudi | Chinese: 口笛 pinyin: kǒudí | China | A koudi. The large hole in the middle is the blowing hole, and the three smaller holes on the top are finger holes. The two open ends of the tube are also used, played with the thumbs. | | |
| Lalove | | Indonesia | | | |
| Malaysian nose flute | | Sarawak, Malaysia | Nose flute on Sarawak | Nose flute | |
| Minteki or shinteki | minteki: (kanji: 明笛 shinteki: (kanji: 清笛)) | Japan | | | |
| Moseño | | Andes Mountains | | | |
| Murali | | Nepal | | | |
| Native American flute | | United States (Native American) | | | |
| Nohkan | 能管 | Japan | Bottom, a Nohkan. The rest are shinobue. | | |
| Ney | | Iran | Turkish ney | | |
| Ohe Hano Ihu | | Hawaii | | | |
| Paiwan nose flute | | Taiwan | Paiwanese nose flute with two pipes. | Nose flute | Instrument of the Paiwan people of Taiwan. |
| Palendag | | Philippines | | | |
| Palwei (German Wikipedia) | Burmese: ပလွေ | Myanmar | Palwei, a Myanmar transverse flute. | | |
| Pinkillu | | Peru, Andes Mountains | Pinkillu flute and tinya drum. The musician plays the flute one handed while playing the drum. | | |
| Quena | | Andes | Quena, made from American species of bamboos, (bamboo genera Aulonemia or Rhipidocladum. Also the tokhoro, a species of cane. | | |
| Ryūteki | | Japan | | | |
| Sáo | Sáo trúc | Vietnam | | | |
| Shakuhachi | 尺八 | Japan | | | |
| Shinobue or takebue | Shinobue: kanji: 篠笛; Takebue: (kanji: 竹笛) | Japan | All but the bottom flute are shinobue. The bottom flute is a Nohkan. | | |
| Sogeum | 소금; 小笒 | Korea | | | |
| Sompoton | Kadazan Dusun: Sompoton | Sabah, Malaysia | | Mouth organ | Bamboo mouth organ with gourd of the indigenous Kadazan, Dusun, and Murut peoples of Sabah. |
| Suling | | Indonesia | Man playing end-blown suling, a bamboo ring flute. | | |
| Suling | | Papua, New Guinea | Woman playing a suling transverse bamboo flute, from Papua, New Guinea. | | |
| Tahitian nose flute | | Tahiti | | Nose flute | Bamboo nose flute bound with bands of colored coconut fiber. Collected from Tahiti, the Society Islands during Cook's voyages to the Pacific 1768–1780. |
| Tongso | 퉁소 | Korea | | | |
| Turali | Kadazan Dusun: Tuahi | Sabah, Malaysia | | Nose flute | Bamboo nose flute of the indigenous Kadazan and Dusun peoples of Sabah. |
| Venu | Sanskrit: वेणु | India | | | |
| Wa | | Myanmar | | | |
| Xiao | Chinese: 簫 Simplified Chinese: 箫 Pinyan: xiāo | China | | | |
| Xindi | Chinese: 新 笛; pinyin: xīndí | China | | | |
| Yak | 약 | Korea | | | |
| Yokobue | | Japan | | | |
| Yue | | China | | | |
