= Yokobue =

Japanese transverse flute

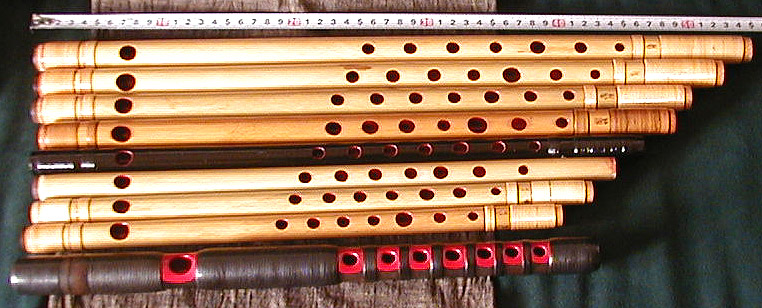
Various kinds of yokobue

A yokobue (横笛) is a Japanese transverse flute or fue. The various types include the komabue, nōkan, ryūteki, and shinobue.

These flutes have an extra closed chamber (for improved timbre and tonal qualities) that extends past the chin to the left shoulder and can be used as a rest in the same way as violins are rested on the left shoulder.

== Yokobue in media ==
- A character in The Tale of Genji by Murasaki Shikibu is named Yokobue because of her musical abilities.
- David Carradine carried what some believed is a yokobue in Quentin Tarantino's Kill Bill, "Kung Fu and Kung Fu the legend continues" and The Silent Flute and lastly "Kung Fu killer". However, the flute's sizes are not equal to that of a yokobue as well as the number of holes being 4

== See also ==
- Bamboo musical instruments
