= Fue (flute) =

Class of flutes native to Japan

Fue (笛/ふえ) is the Japanese word for bamboo flute, and refers to a class of flutes native to Japan. Fue come in many varieties, but are generally high-pitched and made of a bamboo called shinobue. The most popular of the fue is the shakuhachi.

== Categorization ==
Fue are traditionally broken up into two basic categories – the transverse flute and the end-blown flute. Transverse flutes are held to the side, with the musician blowing across a hole near one end; end-blown flutes are held vertically and the musician blows into one end.

== History ==
The earliest fue may have developed from pitch pipes known as paixiao in Chinese. The gabachi instrument eventually made its way over to Japan from China in the 5th century, becoming prevalent during the Nara Period.

Soon after the introduction of fue instruments, members of the Fuke sect of Zen Buddhism made normal use of the shakuhachi. These "priests of nothingness" viewed the instruments as spiritual tools, using them for suizen, or "blowing meditation". Modern fue performance may feature a soloist or involve either a chamber or large ensemble of the instruments.

== Instruments ==
Japanese fue include many different varieties of Japanese flute, including the following:

Image	Name	Type	Description
	Shakuhachi	End-blown	One of the most popular and oldest of the Japanese fue
	Hotchiku	End-blown	Made from the same material as the shakuhachi
	Hichiriki	End-blown	A unique fue in that it is a double reed instrument.
	Gakubue	Transverse	Traditional fue
	Komabue	Transverse	This fue is for komagaku, a type of music used for dances associated with gagaku Imperial Court music.
	Ryūteki	Transverse	Used in Japanese music seeming to have a Chinese origin. Its sound is said to represent the ascension of dragons.
	Nohkan	Transverse	A flute used in the Noh theatre and hayashi ensembles.
	Shinobue	Transverse	Also called the bamboo flute, it is used for nagauta, the background music used in kabuki theatre.
	Kagurabue	Transverse	This fue is used in a type of Japanese music called mikagura. At 45.5 centimetres (17.9 in) long, it is the longest fue.
	Minteki (also known as the Seiteki)	Transverse	Used in ceremony. The sympathetically vibrating membrane, such as on a Chinese dizi, is visible in the photograph between the embouchure hole and finger holes.
