= Minteki =

Japanese flute

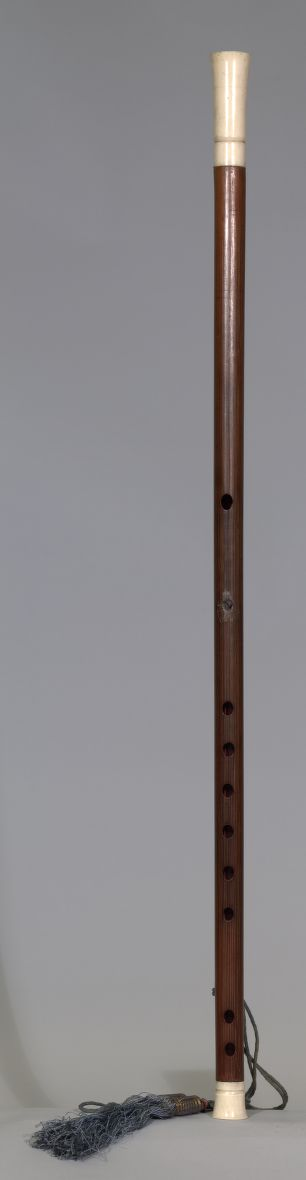
Minteki

The minteki (kanji: 明笛; also called shinteki (kanji: 清笛)) is a Japanese transverse bamboo flute, a fue. It was first introduced to Japan from China in 1629. It is found in minshingaku (明清楽) ensembles.

== See also ==
- Ryuteki
- Bamboo musical instruments
