= Nose flute =

Musical instrument played with air from the nose

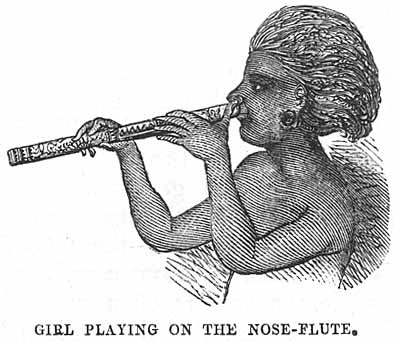
- Fijian girl playing nose flute.

Woodwind instrument
- Classification: Woodwind
- Hornbostel–Sachs classification: 421.111.12 (The player creates a ribbon-shaped stream of air (in this case with nose) through a tube with fingerholes.)
- Developed: Unknown where flutes developed; Asia and Europe have bone flutes thousands of years old. Nose flutes spread in Polynesian and Pacific Rim countries and Africa.

A melody by Susato, played on a plastic nose whistle.
A public domain recording.

The nose flute is a musical instrument, a type of flute played by blowing air through the instrument via the nose. There are different versions of the instrument found in places such as Polynesia, the Pacific Rim and Africa.

The development of different versions are not necessarily historically connected. Instead, they are categorized together because of their similar methods of playing.

== Hawaii ==
In the North Pacific, in the Hawaiian Islands the nose flute was a common courting instrument. In Hawaiian, it is variously called hano, "nose flute", by the more specific term ʻohe hano ihu, "bamboo flute [for] nose," or ʻohe hanu ihu, "bamboo [for] nose breath".

It is made from a single bamboo section. According to Arts and Crafts of Hawai`i by Te Rangi Hiroa, old flutes in the Bishop Museum collection have a hole at the nose area for the breath, and two or three fingering holes. In the three-finger-hole specimen, one fingering hole is placed near the breath hole. Lengths range from 10 to 21 inches (250 to 530 mm).

Oral tradition in various families states that numbers of fingering holes ranged from one to four, and location of the holes varied depending on the musical taste of the player. Though primarily a courting instrument played privately and for personal enjoyment, it also could be used in conjunction with chants, song, and hula. Kumu hula (dance masters), were said to be able to either make the flute sound as though it were chanting, or to chant as they played. Kumu hula Leilehua Yuen is one of the few contemporary Hawaiian musicians to perform with the nose flute in this manner.

== Africa ==
In the Congo, the nose flute is played by eight ethnic groups. A version is also played in Tanzania.

== Philippines ==
In the Philippines, the nose flute (pitung ilong in Tagalog), or the kalaleng of the northern Bontok people (tongali among the Kalinga people), is played with the extreme forward edge of the right or left nostril. Because the kalaleng is long and has a narrow internal diameter, it is possible to play different harmonics through overblowing—even with the rather weak airflow from one nostril. Thus, this nose flute can play notes in a range of two and a half octaves. Finger holes in the side of the bamboo tube change the operating length, giving various scales. Players plug the other nostril to increase the force of their breath through the flute.

== Taiwan ==
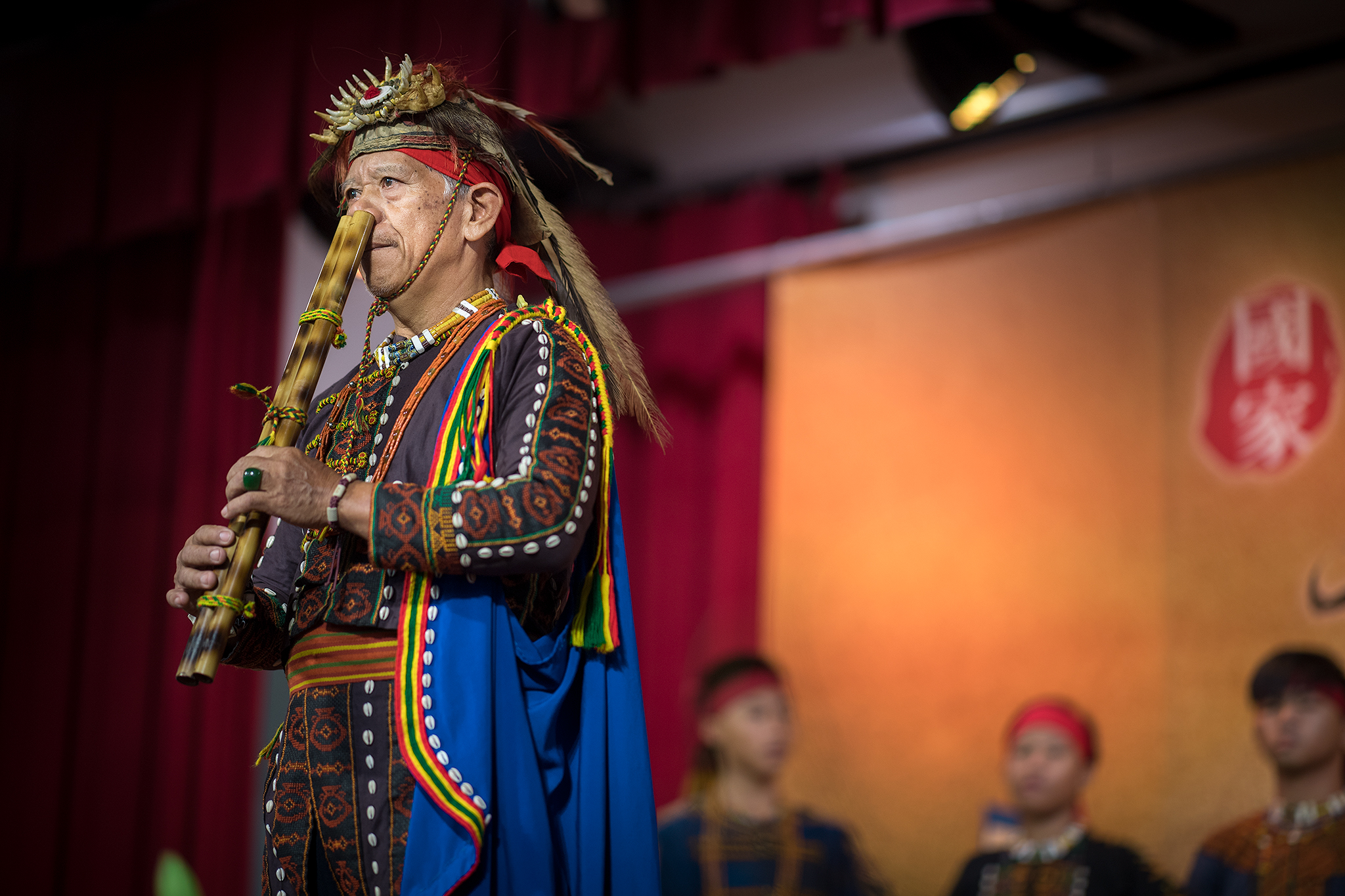
Bamboo nose flute played by Paiwan people

A double-pipe nose flute (Lalingedan) was played by the Paiwan people in Taiwan. Associated with social status, only a noble man could play the Lalingedan, typically during ritual activities such as courtship and funerals, and to deliver messages. The social-status quality of the instrument became less restricted in modern times due to the influence of technology and mainstream culture. Contemporary performances and media representations often associate the sound of the Paiwan nose flute with emotions such as love, longing, and sorrow.

The Rukai people also play a double-pipe nose flute (Rukai: bulalri) with a four-degree scale. Only a noble man or a warrior could play the instrument, and they are only permitted to play specific melodies. Today, the ability to play the instrument is mostly only retained by older generations.

== Micronesia ==
The aangún is a nose flute made of bamboo or mangrove root. They range from 12 to 87 cm in length and typically have one to three fingerholes. The nose flutes originated in Chuuk but similar ones have been found in Pollap, Polowat, Houk, Satawal and the Nomoi Islands. Chuukese men used to play traditional love songs called engi on these flutes, but they are now considered obsolete.

== New Zealand ==
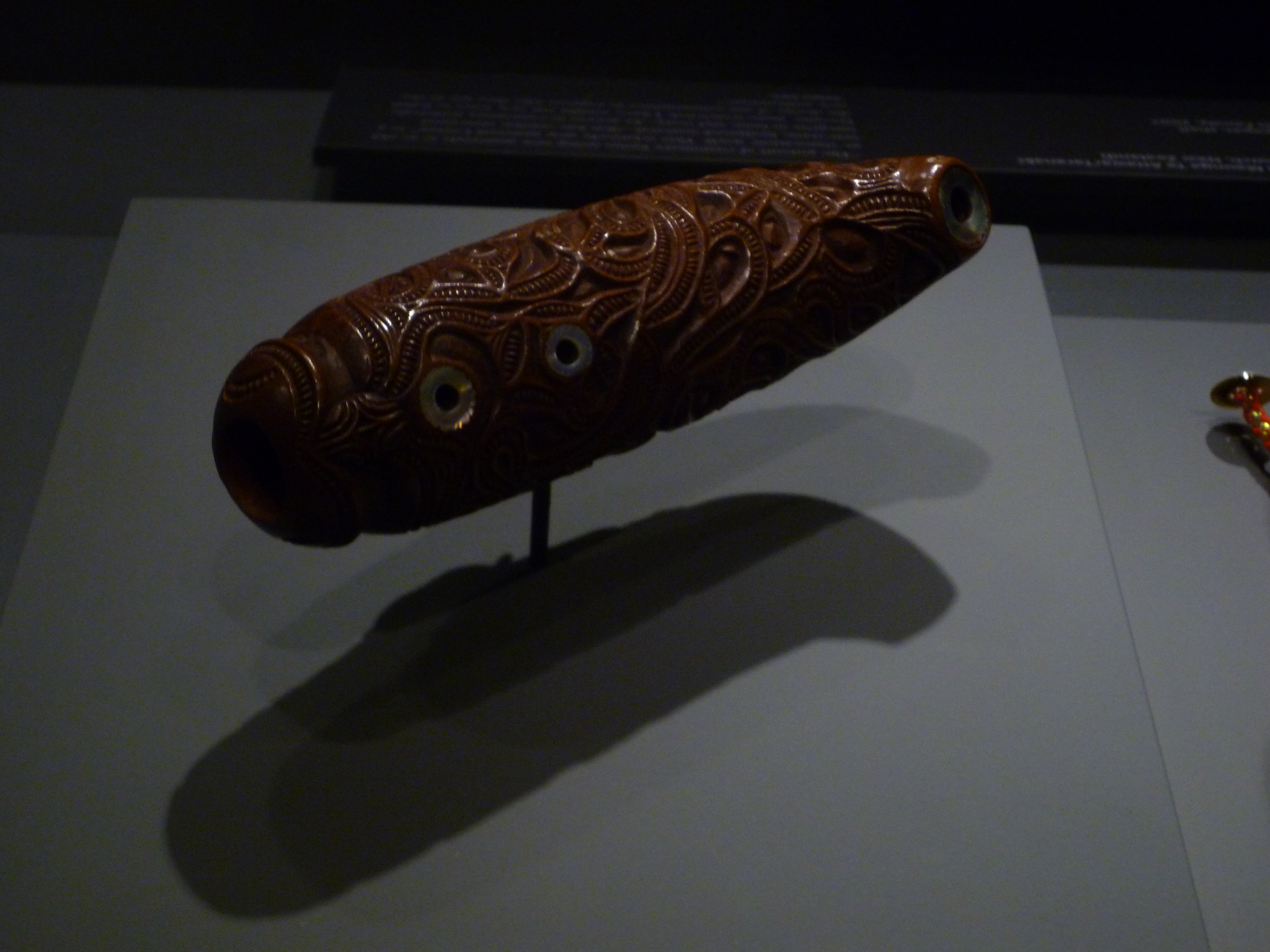
Nguru from New Zealand

Historically in New Zealand, the Māori carved nguru from wood, the stem of a gourd and whale's teeth. Nguru were often adorned with very elaborate carvings, befitting what is considered a sacred object. Although Nguru are commonly known as nose flutes, it is only the smaller instruments that can be played with the nose, more commonly Nguru are played with the mouth.

The Māori "kōauau ponga ihu", a gourd nose flute, was also part of the nose flute tradition; note that a similarly constructed gourd nose flute, ipu ho kio kio was also used in Hawaii. The maker would form a nose hole in the neck (or stem) of the gourd, by cutting off the neck at a fairly small cross-section. This small hole is placed under the player's nostril, in order to generate the flute-tone. The kōauau ponga ihu functions as an ocarina in its acoustic principles. Several notes of a scale can be obtained by drilling finger holes into the "bowl" of the gourd.

== Polynesia ==
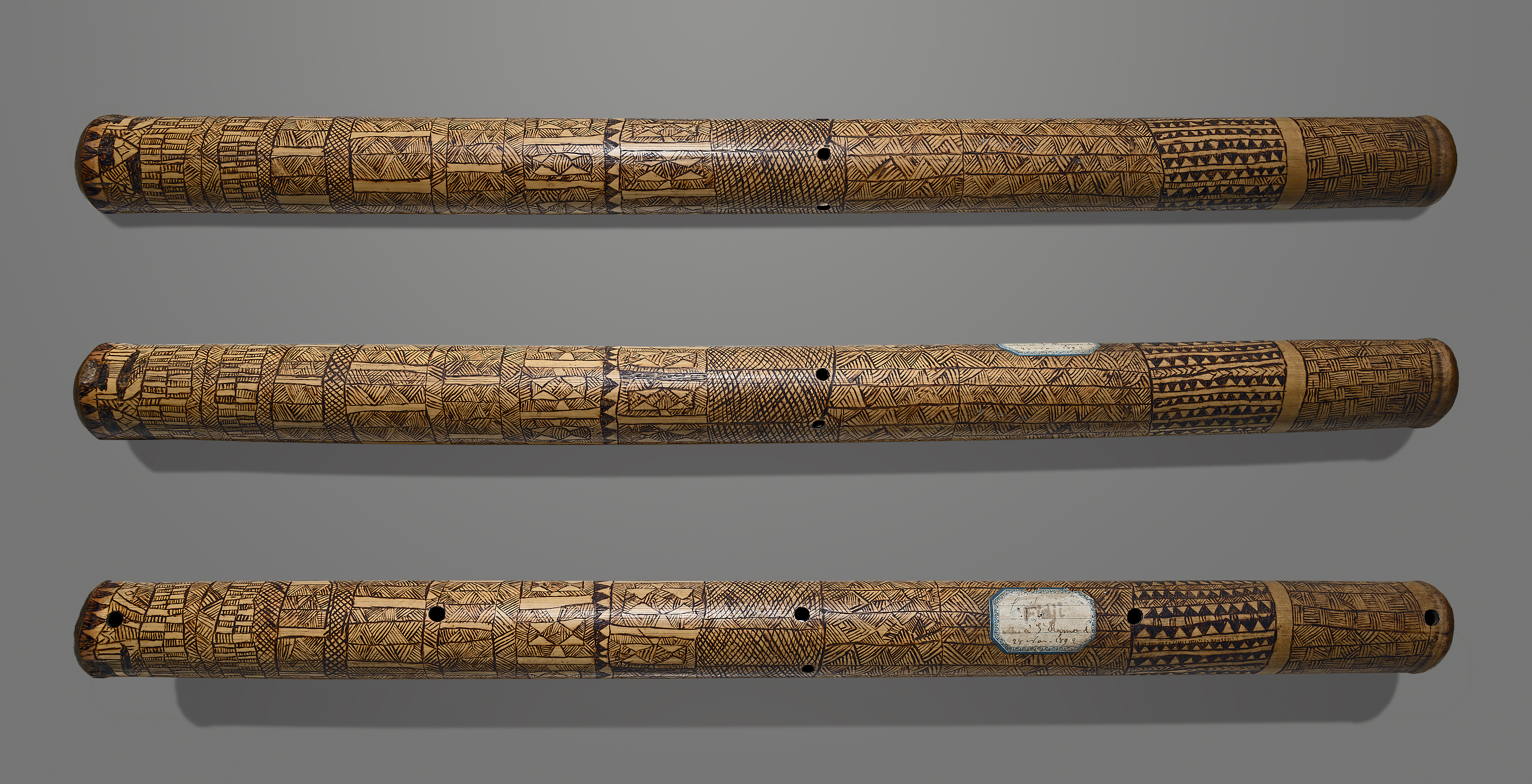
Fijian nose flute from 1838, MHNT collection

The Fijian nose flute is made from bamboo with five equidistant holes. The central of these holes is part of a ring of four holes equidistant around the circumference. Typically, only the holes on either end are fingered, so the instrument can play four total notes. The preservation of the instrument is difficult because the hole positioning renders it easily cracked.

A variation, the 'Fangufangu' nose flute of the island of Tonga is made with intact node walls at both ends of the bamboo tube, with the nostril holes on the side in front of the nodes (along with side finger holes) and a hole in the middle of the tube, acting as a vent hole, and taking the place of the open distal end. Thus the 'Fangufangu' can be played from either end, and the disposition of the fingerholes differ from node to vent hole so two alternating scales can be played, but only one scale at a time.

== See also ==
- Nose whistle
