= Kagura =

Type of ceremonial dance in Shinto ritual

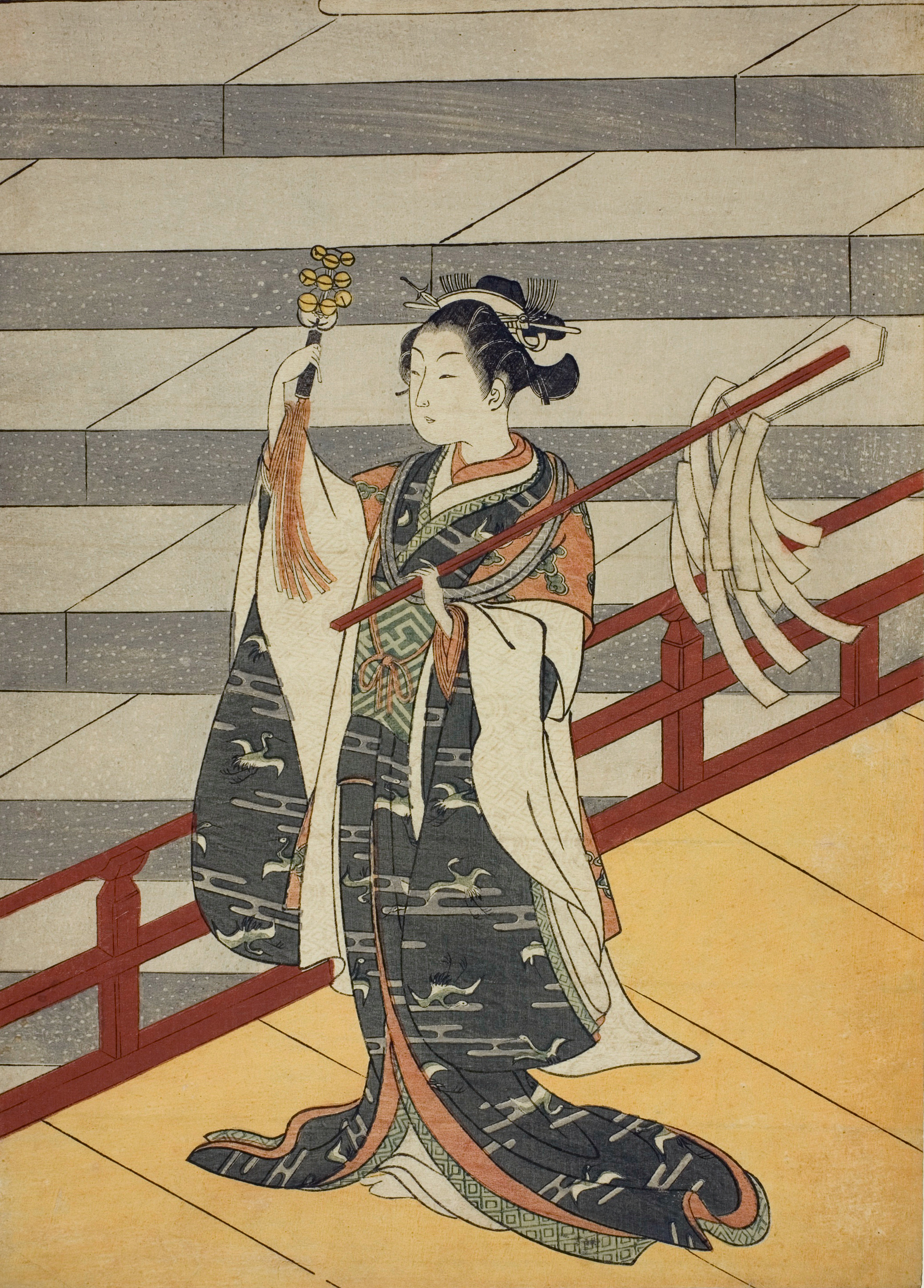
The Kagura Dancer, by Suzuki Harunobu. Edo period, c. 1766

Kagura (神楽(かぐら), "god-entertainment") is a type of Shinto ritual ceremonial dance. The term is a contraction of the phrase kami no kura ("seat of god"), indicating the presence of gods (kami) in the practice.

One major function of kagura is chinkon (purifying and shaking the spirit), involving a procession-trance process. Usually a female shaman will perform the dance and obtain the oracle from the god—in the setting, the dancer herself turns into the god during the performance. Once strictly a ceremonial art derived from kamigakari (神懸, "oracular divinification"), kagura has evolved in many directions over the span of more than a millennium. Today, it is very much a living tradition, with rituals tied to the rhythms of the agricultural calendar, thriving primarily in parts of Shimane Prefecture, and urban centers such as Hiroshima.

Selections from an Iwami Kagura performance in Shimane Prefecture, 2024

== Types of kagura ==
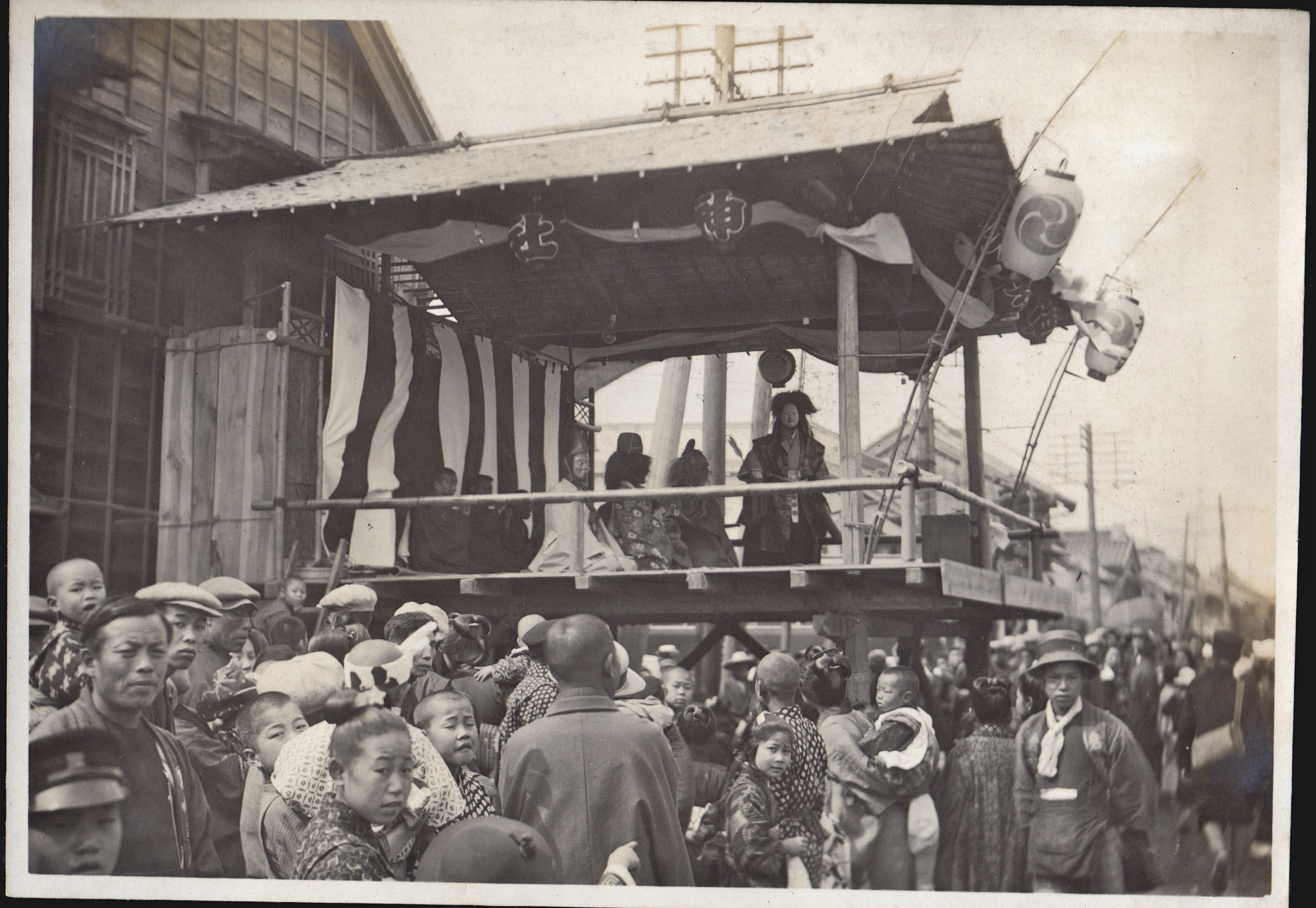
Kagura dancing on a platform, 1914

There are two major types of kagura: mai and odori. Mai consists of slow circular movement, stressing quiet and elegance, while odori consists of quick leaping and jumping, stressing activation and energy. The two types can be understood as two phases of kagura: mai is a preparation process for trance and odori is the unconscious trance stage.

During mai, the female shaman, surrounded by a group of priests, holds a gohei (a ceremonial wand used to cleanse or purify) as well as sound-producing instruments and engages with circling movement to summon deities. Once the female shaman enters a possessed state, she switches into the spontaneous leaping movements of odori.

== History ==
The epics Kojiki and Nihon Shoki describe a folktale origin for the dances. In these texts, there is a famous legendary tale about the sun goddess Amaterasu, who retreated into a cave, bringing darkness and cold to the world. Ame-no-Uzume, goddess of the dawn and of revelry, led the other gods in a wild dance, and persuaded Amaterasu to emerge to see what the ruckus was all about. Kagura is one of a number of rituals and arts said to derive from this event.

Originally called kamukura/kamikura (神座), kagura began as sacred dances performed at the Imperial court by shrine maidens (miko) who were supposedly descendants of Ame-no-Uzume. During the performance, the shrine maidens usually utilize a channeling device for god such as masks and spears to imitate the trance. With the kagura music that has the power to summon the gods, the miko start to dance to transform themselves into the representation of the gods and receive messages as well as blessings from the deities. In 1871, Iwami Shinto offices claimed that theatrical kagura performed by priests in the west of Japan demeaned their dignity and therefore banned the performance. Owing to the support of civilian performing groups at that time, the performance pieces were still preserved.

Over time, however, these mikagura (御神楽) performed within the sacred and private precincts of the Imperial courts, inspired popular ritual dances, called satokagura (里神楽), which, being popular forms, practiced in villages all around the country, were adapted into various other folk traditions and developed into a number of different forms. Among these are miko kagura, shishi kagura, and Ise-style and Izumo-style kagura dances. Many more variations have developed over the centuries, including some which are fairly new, and most of which have become highly secularized folk traditions.

Kagura, in particular those forms that involve storytelling or reenactment of fables, is also one of the primary influences on the Noh theatre.

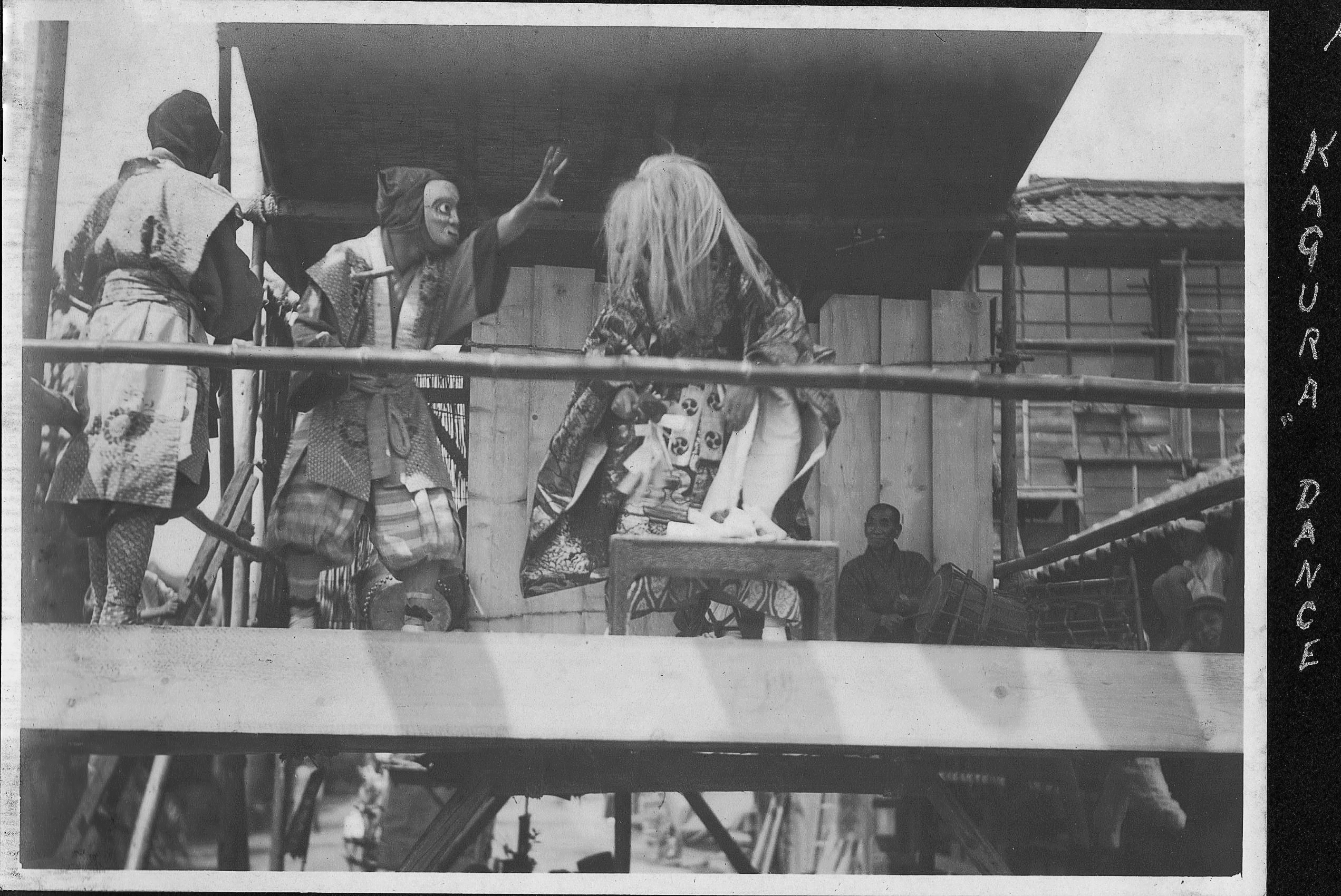
Kagura dance in 1914

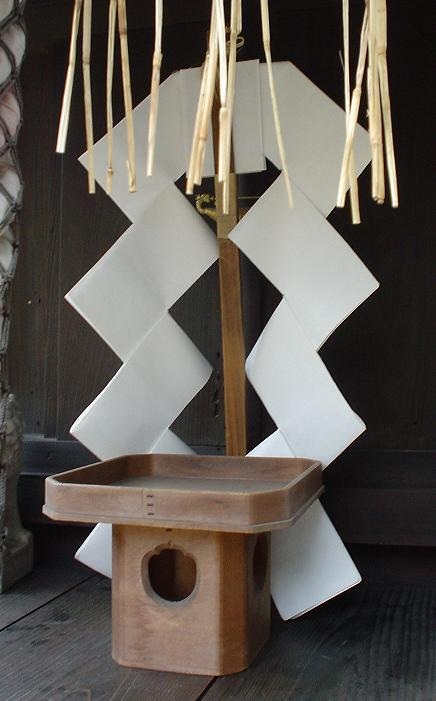
Gohei – a ceremonial wand used to cleanse or purify

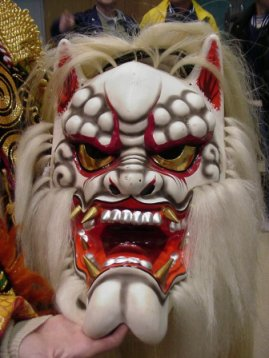
Mask from contemporary kagura performance

== Imperial kagura ==
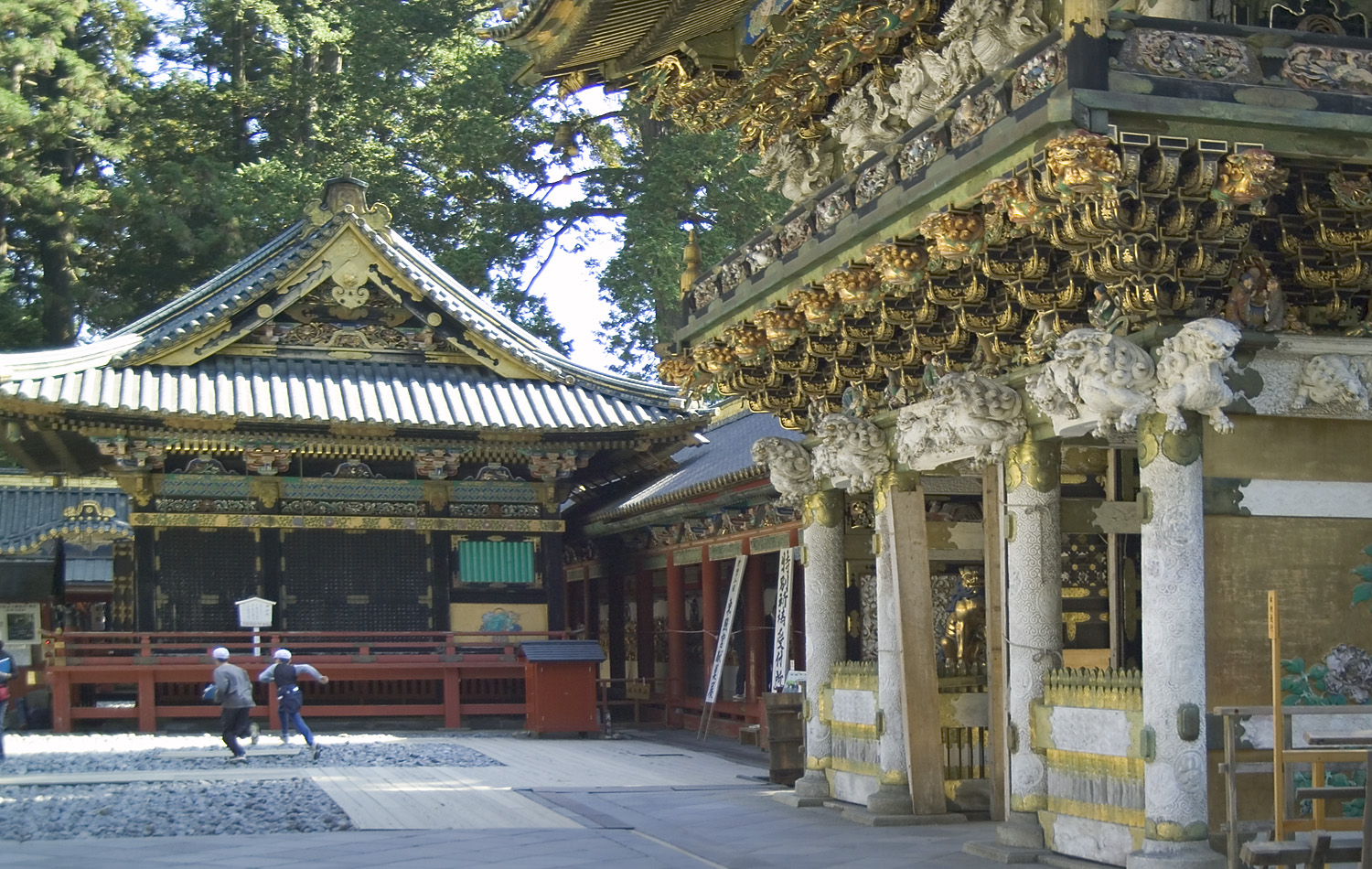
Kagura-den at Nikkō Tōshō-gū

Mikagura (御神楽) is a ritual dance performed at the imperial court and at important Shinto shrines: Kamo-jinja and Iwashimizu Hachiman-gū. It consists of welcoming, entertaining and greeting the deities with humorous or poetic syllabic songs. Today it is sometimes considered as a sub-genre of gagaku, of which it is one of the influences. It predated Chinese inspiration, and has indigenous elements as well as influences from other elements such as kangen (管弦), bugaku (舞楽) and saibara (催馬楽), which are forms of gagaku, More simply, mikagura can be considered dances accompanied by gagaku music.

The kagura-uta is the sacred vocal repertoire of 26 songs (Niwabi, Achime, Sakaki, Karakami, Hayakarakami, Komomakura, Sazanami, Senzai, Hayauta, Hoshi, Asakura, Sonokoma, etc.) traditionally performed by a male choir for several days, but reduced today to 12 chants performed in six hours. Instruments used include the yokobue (笛) and/or the hichiriki, with the possible addition of a yamatogoto and shakubyoshi claves.

There are several mikagura dances, including:

- The Yamato Mai (大和舞, "dance of Japan"), associated with the Yamato uta (大和歌, "song of Japan"), making use of the ryūteki or hichiriki and a pair of shakubyōshi, and with or without a zither;
- The Azuma Asobi (東遊, "Eastern Entertainment"), using the komabue;
- The Kume Mai (久米舞, "dance of Kume"), associated with the kume uta, using the kagurabue, the hichiriki and the wagon.

The formal Imperial ritual dances are performed in a number of sacred places and on a number of special occasions. At the Imperial Sanctuary, where a replica of the Yata no kagami is kept, they are performed as part of gagaku court music. Mikagura are also performed at the Imperial harvest festival and at major shrines such as Ise, Kamo, and Iwashimizu Hachiman-gū. This practice, known as naishidokoro no mikagura, was formally established by Emperor Ichijō in 1002, though it only became an annual event from 1098 onward. Performances traditionally took place in the courtyard of the naishidokoro around a bonfire, with two facing groups of musicians, the motokata on the left and the suekata on the right, engaging in a form of musical dialogue, the motokata performing kamiuta songs and the suekata performing pieces drawing on ancient folk texts; a sakaki branch used in the dance was traditionally presented to the emperor at the performance's conclusion.

According to the Board of Ceremonies of the Imperial Household Agency, mikagura still take place every December in the Imperial Sanctuary and at the Imperial harvest festival ceremonies.

== Folk kagura ==
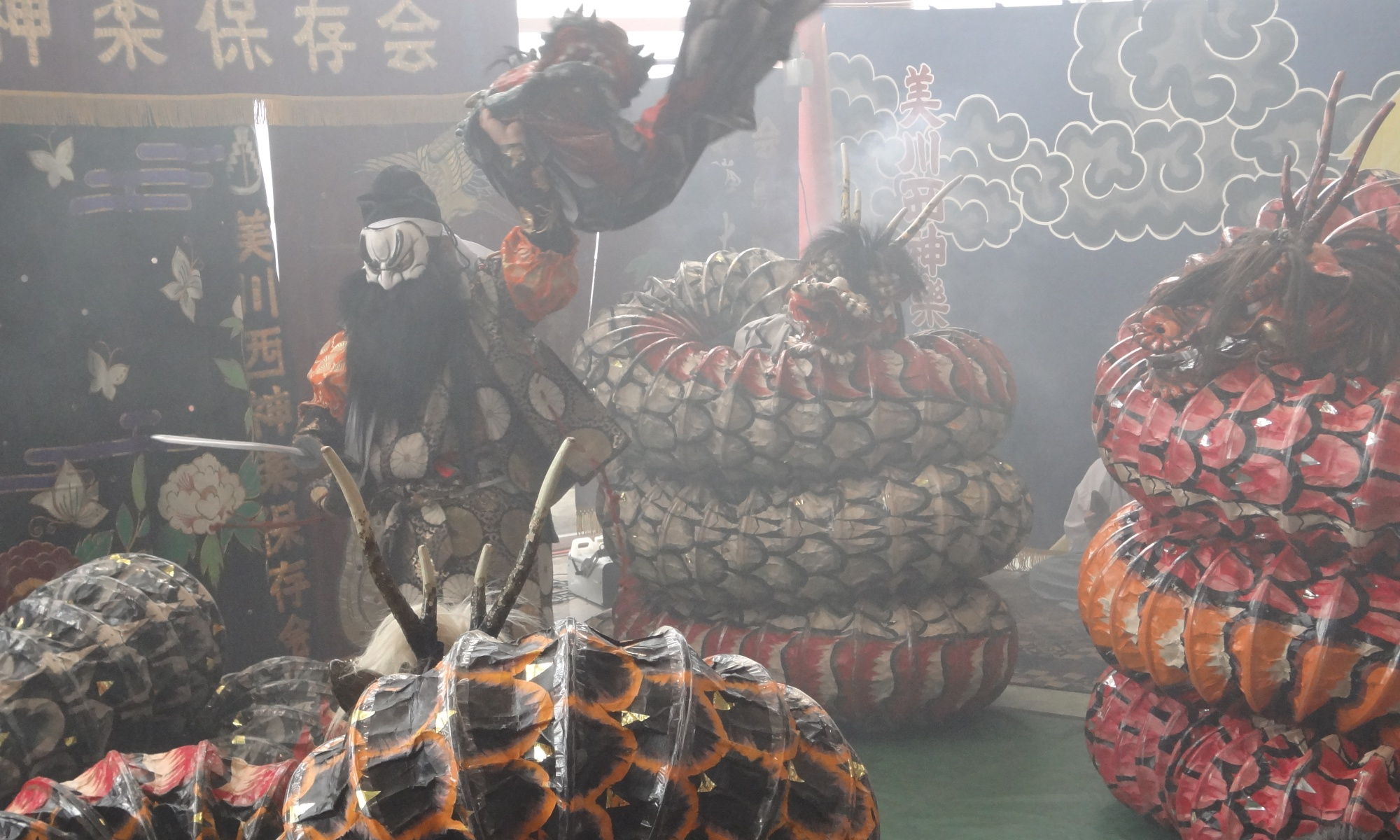
Susanoo and Orochi in Izumo-ryū kagura

Satokagura, or "normal kagura", is a wide umbrella term containing a great diversity of folk dances derived from the Imperial ritual dances (mikagura), and incorporated with other folk traditions. It is the partial origin of both Noh and kyōgen. A number of traditions of folk kagura exist:

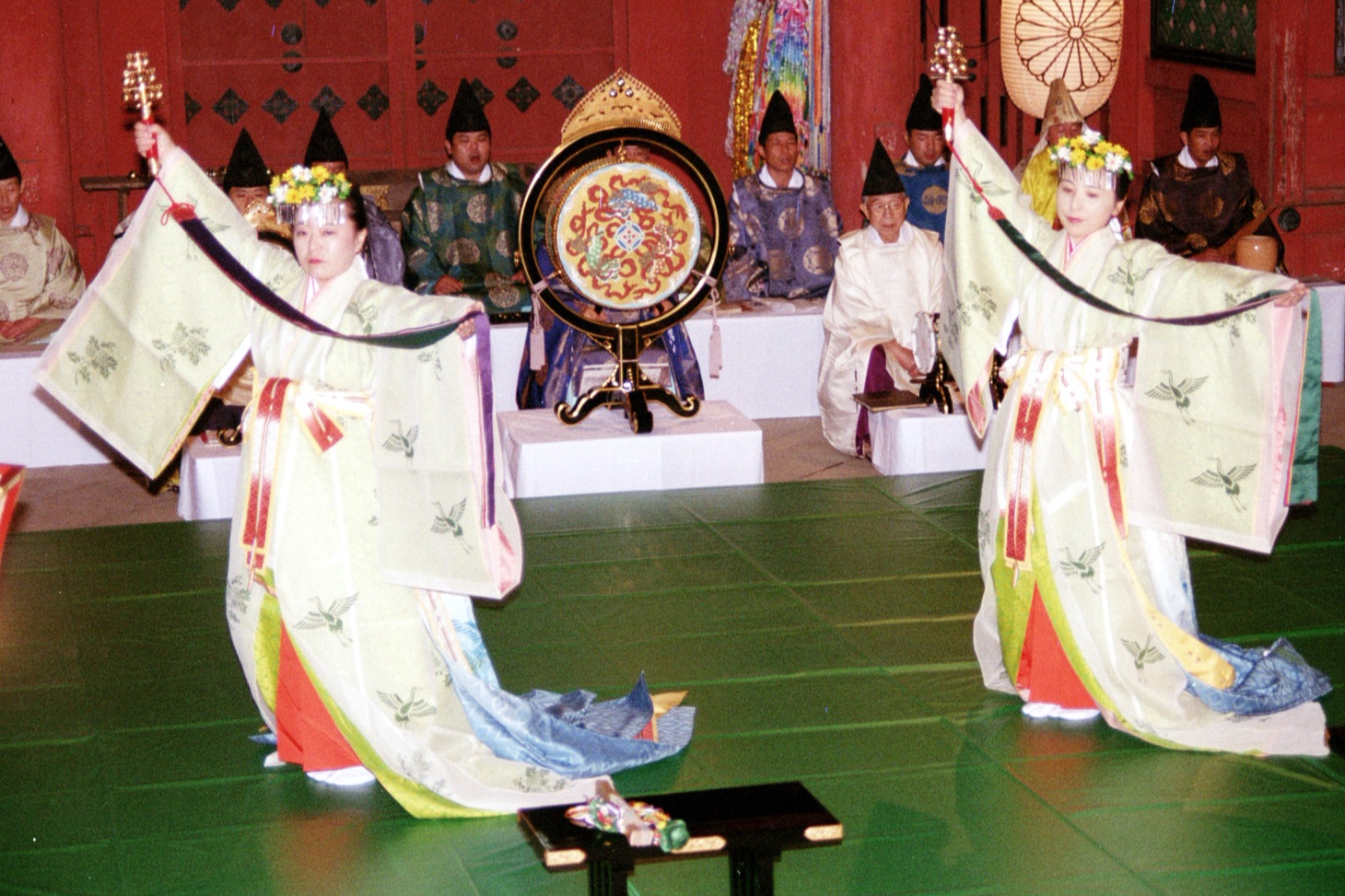
Miko kagura

- Miko kagura – dances performed by shrine maidens (miko) originally derived from ritual dances in which the miko channeled the kami, as part of Imperial Court dances. These originally had a very loose form, akin to similar god-possession dances and rituals, but over time they have developed, into highly regular set forms. Today, they are performed by shrines during the daijō-sai (大嘗祭) festival and in worship to kami as part of a matsuri. They are also performed at Buddhist temples as a martial arts performance. These dances are often performed with ritual props, such as bells, bamboo canes, sprigs of sakaki, or paper streamers.
- Izumo-ryū kagura – dances based on those performed at Izumo Shrine serve a number of purposes, including ritual purification, celebration of auspicious days, and the reenactment of folktales. Originally quite popular in the Chūgoku region, near Izumo, these dances have spread across the country, and have developed over the centuries, becoming more of a secular folk entertainment and less of a formal religious ritual. The sacred dance of the Sada shrine has been inscribed on the UNESCO list of Intangible cultural heritage of humanity since 2011.
- Hayachine Kagura – a form of dances derived from Yamabushi (a mobile group that embraces ascetic lives to gain power). This genre stresses on the power and energy. The performers always wear masks and use tools such as drum and sword to represent the magical power processed by Yamabushi. It was inscribed in 2009 as an Intangible cultural heritage of humanity by UNESCO.
- Yutate kagura – a form of dances where miko and priests dip bamboo leaves in hot water and splash the hot water on themselves by shaking the leaves, and then scattering the hot water to people around the area.
- Shishi kagura – a form of lion dance, in which a group of dancers take on the role of the lion (shishi) and parade around the town. The lion mask and costume is seen as, in some ways, embodying the spirit of the lion, and this is a form of folk worship and ritual, as other forms of lion dances are in Japan and elsewhere.
- Daikagura – a form of dance deriving from rituals performed by traveling priests between Ise Grand Shrine and Atsuta Shrine, who would travel to villages, crossroads, and other locations to help the locals by driving away evil spirits. Acrobatic feats and lion dances played a major role in these rituals.

Around the time of the beginning of the Tokugawa shogunate (1603–1868), performances derived from this emerged in Edo as a major form of entertainment. In connection with the celebrations surrounding the beginning of the shogunate, lion dances, acrobatics, juggling, and a great variety of other entertainments were performed on stages across the city, all nominally under the auspices of daikagura. Over the course of the period, these came to be more closely associated with rakugo storytelling and other forms of popular entertainment. Daikagura continues to be performed to this day and include many elements of street entertainment.

== See also ==
- Gagaku
- Glossary of Shinto
- Kagura suzu
- Mystery plays
- Kagura Service in Tenrikyo
