= Hayashi (music) =

Performers who accompany a Noh or Kabuki theater

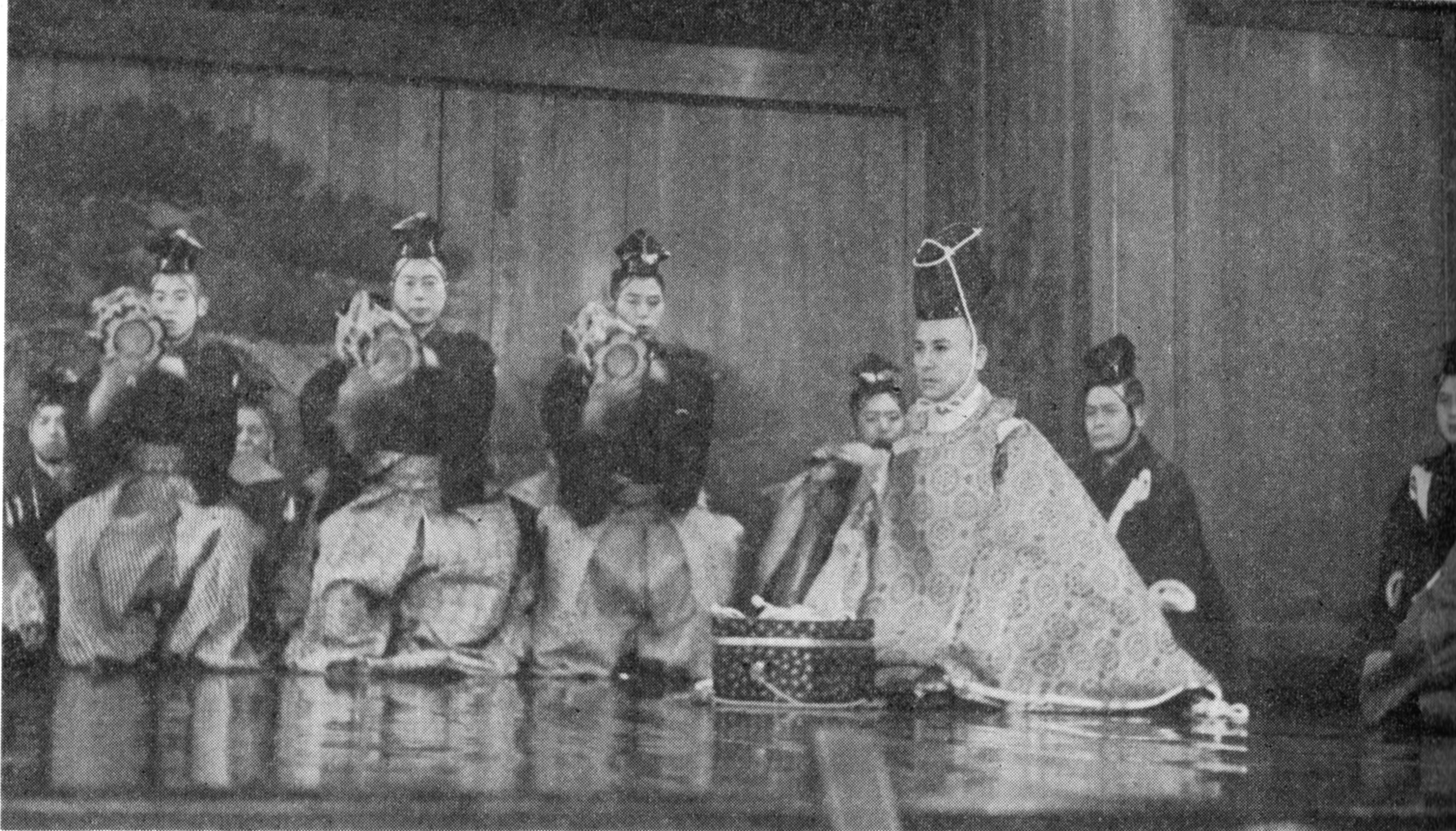
Group of three hayashi performers (kotsuzumi and flute) in a Nō performance

A hayashi (囃子) is a group of performers who provide musical accompaniment for Japanese Nō or kabuki theatre, yose (寄席) performances of rakugo, or a festival.

In Nō, the hayashi sit along the rear of the stage, facing the audience and fully visible. A distinct and separate group of performers from the chorus, they are purely instrumentalists; the type of instruments featured and the order in which they sit on stage follow established practices. The leftmost performer plays a small taiko, set on a stand before him, with two drumsticks. To his right is the ōtsuzumi hip drum, followed by the kotsuzumi shoulder drum, and the Noh flute (nōkan or simply fue).

In kabuki, a number of shamisen players are added, along with, depending on the play, taiko drums of various sizes, various types of flutes, and other instruments, including a myriad of devices for sound effects. The kabuki hayashi is generally located in a small room just off-stage, and is not visible to the audience, though a barred window in the walls of the stage set indicates its location. For matsubame plays and dances, those based on works from Noh and kyōgen, the hayashi will often be located along the rear of the stage, fully visible in imitation of Noh and kyōgen modes.

As with kabuki actors, and other performers in traditional arts, instrumentalists in the traditions of Noh hayashi, kabuki hayashi, and nagauta shamisen (the shamisen style used in kabuki and bunraku), are members of a number of traditional lineages, following the iemoto system. Performers traditionally take on the name of their school as an art-name (i.e. stage name). Notable hayashi lineages include the Tōsha school, Mochizuki school, and Tanaka school. Nagauta shamisen schools include the Kineya school and Imafuji school, among others.

In a rakugo yose, the music includes shamisen and percussion parts. At festivals, the performers play flutes and percussion instruments.
