= Kokiriko =

Japanese percussion instrument

The kokiriko (kanji: こきりこ; is a Japanese musical instrument used when singing and dancing to Japanese folk songs such as the "Kokiriko Bushi" (Kokiriko Dance). In kanji, it is written as "Chikuko." In the Middle Ages, it was a type of street performer, known as a kokiriko, which was always carried by the houka, who mainly performed acrobatics.

== Overview ==
The kokiriko can hold bamboo pieces cut to 7.5 sun (approximately 23 centimeters) in length, one in each hand, with their fingertips, and spin them while striking and dancing and singing. The pieces are about 1 centimeter in diameter. In Japan, kokiriko have been used since the Middle Ages, and the hōgashi (throwing sergeants) who appeared from the mid- Muromachi period onwards always struck the kokiriko.

The folk song "Kokiriko Bushi" makes full use of the "Kokiriko" as an instrument. The Kokiriko Bushi is famous in the Gokayama region of Toyama Prefecture, but can also be seen in the Ayakomai dance of Onadani, in Kashiwazaki, Niigata.

In the Gokayama Kokiriko Bushi, the length of the bamboo is clearly sung, "The bamboo of the kokiriko is seven and a half inches long..." and the hōga is also sung, "The kokiriko of the hōga sings while looking at the moon..." Another folk instrument used to accompany the kokiriko Bushi is the sasara. It is also known as one of the special skills of hōga, a type of street performance.

The Hogashi would walk around singing story songs by beating the kokiriko together or standing at the crossroads, and were especially popular with children.
