= Komagaku =

Komagaku (高麗楽) is a style of gagaku, the traditional court music of Japan. It developed primarily during the Heian period and is based largely on musical traditions transmitted from Koguryeo and other regions of the Three Kingdoms of Korea, collectively known as sankangaku. Komagaku is frequently performed as accompaniment for court dances.

In contrast to other forms of gagaku, Komagaku does not employ plucked string instruments, relying instead on wind and percussion instruments.

== History ==
Komagaku emerged during the early Heian period as part of reforms to the Japanese court music system. These reforms reorganized earlier imported musical styles, incorporating musical elements from the Korean peninsula and neighboring regions into a formalized court repertoire. Komagaku was distinguished from other gagaku categories by its geographic origins and instrumentation, and it became closely associated with specific ceremonial and dance traditions at the imperial court.

== Musical characteristics ==
Komagaku is characterized by its exclusive use of wind and percussion instruments. Typical instruments include the komabue (a transverse bamboo flute), taiko, kakko, and shōko. The absence of string instruments gives Komagaku a distinctive timbre compared to togaku, another major gagaku style.

Rhythmically, Komagaku pieces often feature lively tempos and strong percussive patterns, reflecting their historical use in dance accompaniment.

== Dance and performance ==
Komagaku is most commonly performed in conjunction with traditional court dances, particularly bugaku. The dances associated with Komagaku are typically energetic and stylized, with performers wearing masks and elaborate costumes. These performances were historically presented at court ceremonies and continue to be preserved by imperial and cultural institutions in Japan.

== Repertoire ==
The Komagaku repertoire consists of a limited number of pieces compared to other gagaku styles. Many works are believed to preserve musical structures derived from ancient Korean court music, though they have been adapted over centuries within the Japanese court tradition.

== See also ==
- Gagaku
- Bugaku
- Togaku
- Music of Korea
- Music of Japan
