= Nohkan =

Japanese bamboo flute

A lacquered nohkan

The Nohkan (能管) is a high pitched, Japanese transverse bamboo flute, or fue (笛). It is commonly used in traditional Imperial Noh and Kabuki theatre. The nohkan flute was created by Kan'ami and his son Zeami in the 15th century, during the time when the two were transforming the Noh theatre forms Dengaku and Sarugaku.

== Construction ==
The nohkan or fue' ("flute") is made of split and tapered strips of smoked bamboo (susudake) or burned bamboo (yakidake), glued together to form a tapering conical bore. The smoking carbonizes the bamboo and preserves it. The split strips of bamboo are reversed to place the hard bamboo surface on the inside for improved acoustics. Some modern versions of nohkan use an interior coating of tempera paint for this. The strips are then glued together, bound with thin strips of twisted cherry bark (kabamaki) and lacquered to make the conical tube. The result is a keyless tube of 39.1 cm with an average bore width of 1.7 cm and there are 7 finger holes.

The nohkan has an unusual internal bore restriction of about 2–3 mm called a nodo ("throat"). This throat, combined with the conical bore, gives the nohkan its unique high pitched sound by shifting the overblown register notes via a venturi effect. It also has an oval embouchure hole across which the player blows, and a head joint plug consisting of a lead cylinder wrapped in paper and wax and placed inside the tube just above the embouchure hole. The nohkan plays a strong high pitch (hishigi) that is rich with high frequency harmonics.

== Key and range ==
The range of the flute is over two octaves. Each flute is traditionally an individual and made a bit differently each time by the maker-player, the keynote frequency varies from flute to flute.

== See also ==
- Ryuteki
- Shinobue, another Japanese transverse bamboo flute
- Shakuhachi, a Japanese end-blown bamboo flute
- Bamboo musical instruments
