= Shinobue =

High-pitched Japanese transverse fue (flute)

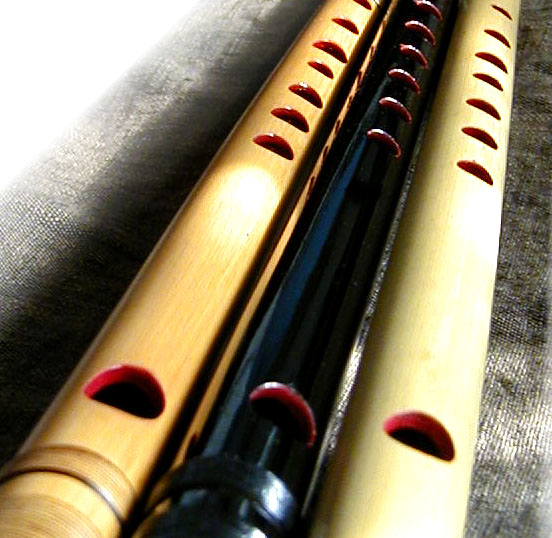
From left, 7-hole Uta-you Shinobue in B-flat ("6-hon choshi") top binding 7-hole Uta-you Shinobue in B ("7-hon choshi") black painted 7-hole Uta-you Shinobue in C ("8-hon choshi") without binding

The shinobue (kanji: 篠笛; also called takebue (kanji: 竹笛) in the context of Japanese traditional arts) is a Japanese transverse flute or fue that has a high-pitched sound.

== Usage ==
It is found in hayashi and nagauta ensembles, and plays important roles in noh and kabuki theatre music. It is heard in Shinto music such as kagura-den and in traditional Japanese folk songs.

== Variations ==
There are three styles: uta (song), hayashi (festival), and doremi. The uta is tuned to a Japanese variant of the shi'er lü scale, while the temperament of the hayashi vary across regions. The doremi is tuned to the western scale; hence the name.

== See also ==
- Ryuteki
- Bamboo musical instruments
