= Kagurabue =

Musical instrument

The kagurabue (神楽笛) is a six or seven-hole transverse bamboo flute used to support Japanese kagura performance.

The kagurabue can also be known as a yamatobue (大和笛).
