= Komabue =

Japanese flute

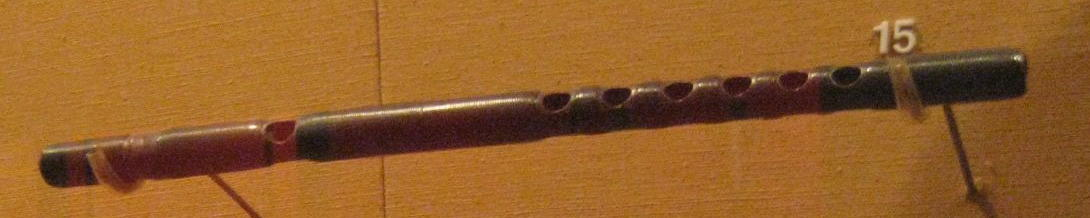
A komabue fue

The komabue (高麗笛; "Koma flute") is a transverse bamboo flute, a fue that is used in traditional Japanese court music.

== Construction ==
The komabue is typically constructed from bamboo. It is a transverse flute with six finger-holes. It is 36 cm (14 in), shorter than the ryuteki flute.

== Use ==
The komabue is used in both Gagaku and Komagaku. Historically the Oga family of musicians in Japan specialized in the komabue.
