= Transverse flute =

Musical instrument

A transverse flute or side-blown flute is a flute which is held horizontally when played. The player blows across the embouchure hole, in a direction perpendicular to the flute's body length.

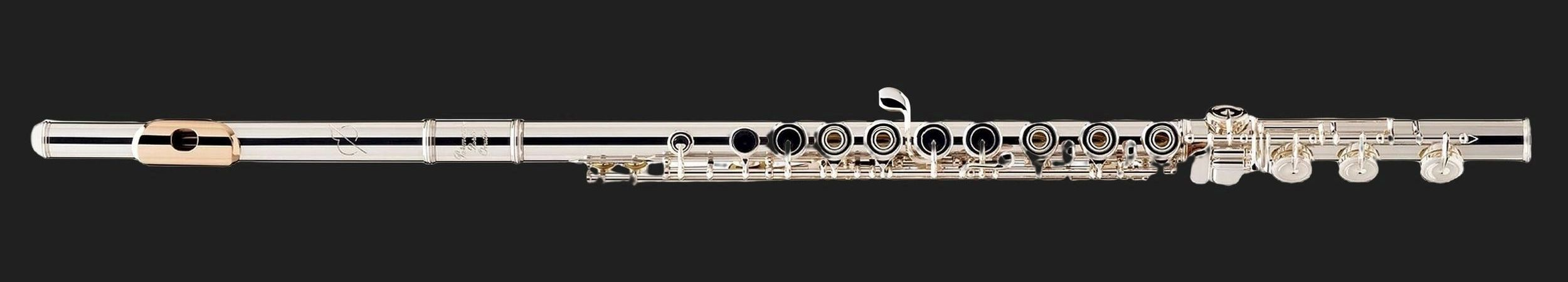
Transverse flute with B Foot, also with C Foot available (Buffet Crampon)

Transverse flutes include the Western concert flute, the Irish flute, the Indian classical flutes (the bansuri and the venu), the Chinese dizi, the Western fife, a number of Japanese fue, and Korean flutes such as daegeum, junggeum and sogeum.

== See also ==
- End-blown flute
