= Ryūteki =

Japanese flute

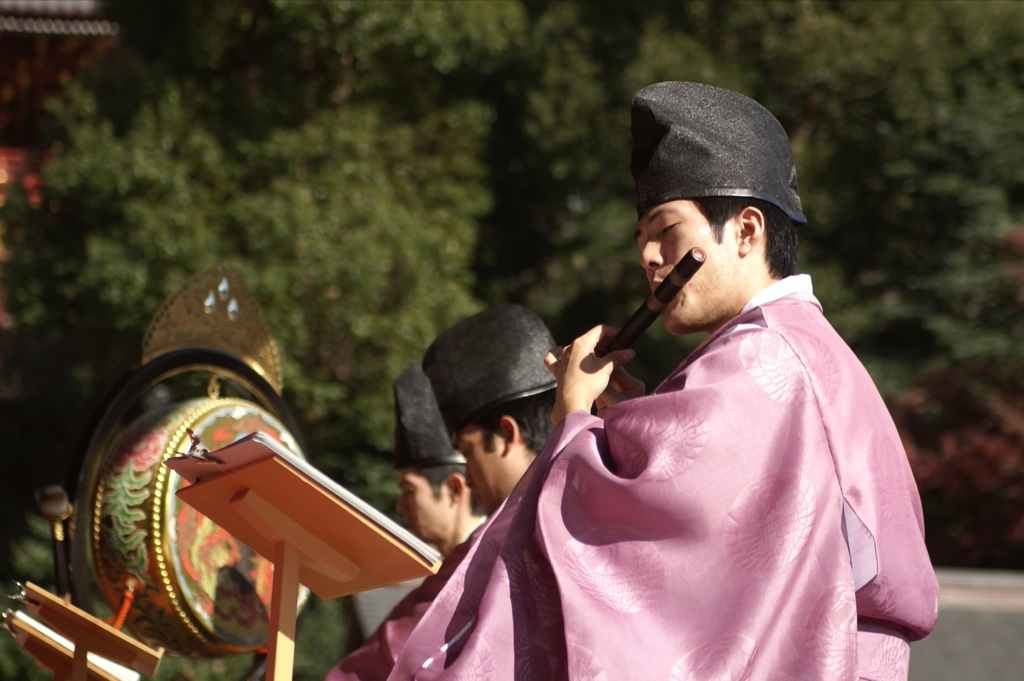
A Japanese ryūteki player in Kamakura, Kanagawa

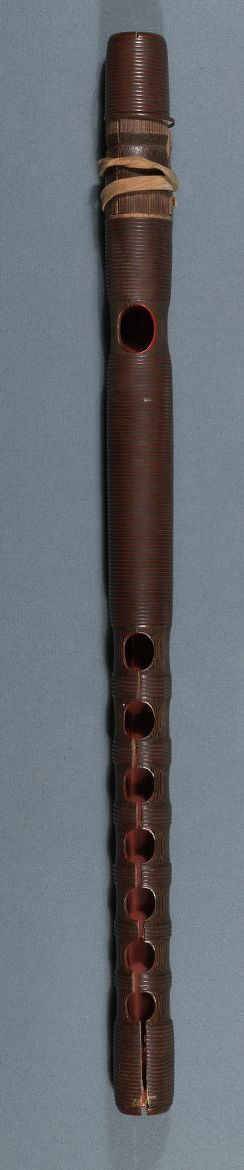
A traditional ryūteki fue

The ryūteki (龍笛; literally "dragon flute") is a Japanese transverse fue made of bamboo. It is used in gagaku, the Shinto classical music associated with Japan's imperial court. The sound of the ryūteki is said to represent the dragons which ascend the skies between the heavenly lights (represented by the shō) and the people of the earth (represented by the hichiriki). The ryūteki is one of the three flutes used in gagaku, in particular to play songs of Chinese style. The pitch is lower than that of the komabue and higher than that of the kagurabue.

The ryūteki is held horizontally, has seven holes, and has a length of 40 centimetres (1 ft 4 in) and an inner diameter of 1.3 centimetres (1/2 in). Unlike the western flute, the holes are not covered by the fingertips, rather, the fleshy part of the finger is used. This allows for better control of "half-holing" techniques and chromatic notes, by simply raising the finger slightly above the holes.

Hans Werner Henze calls for this instrument for his El Cimarrón, and Karlheinz Stockhausen scored for ryūteki in the original Gagaku-ensemble version of Jahreslauf (act 1 of the opera Dienstag aus Licht).
