= Paidi =

Paidi or Páidí may refer to the following:

== People ==
- Paidi (Telugu: పైడి) is a Telugu surname.
  - Paidi Jairaj (1909–2000), Indian legendary film actor, director and producer and winner of Dada Saheb Palke Award.
  - Paidi Lakshmayya, Indian parliamentarian, writer and administrator
  - Paidi Rakesh Reddy, Indian politician
- Páidí is an Irish given name
  - Paídi O'Brien (born 1984), professional cyclist
  - Páidí Ó Lionáird, Irish television presenter and columnist
  - Páidí Ó Sé (1955–2012), Gaelic football player and manager

== Music instruments ==
- Paidi (instrument)
