= Feral donkeys in Australia =

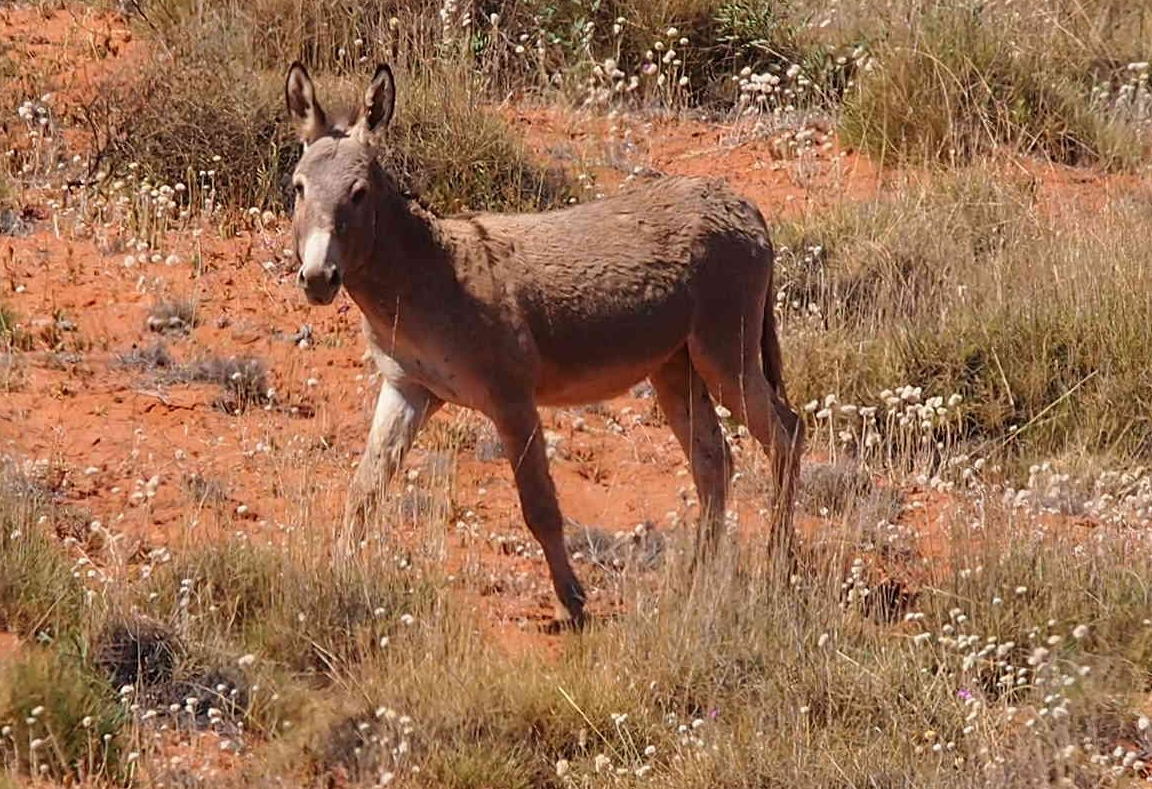
Feral donkey, Central Australia

Feral donkeys were first brought to Australia as pack animals to replace horses, which had succumbed to native poisonous plants. Now numbering 5 million, they have been declared a pest, owing to their damage to vegetation and erosion of soil. Culling is mainly carried out by marksmen in helicopters, and experiments are being made in fertility control.

== History ==
Feral donkeys in Australia (and elsewhere) are donkeys (scientific name Equus asinus) which escaped from captivity, and are living and breeding in the wild. Donkeys originated in Africa and in parts of Asia, and are part of the family Equidae. While donkeys display many horse-like characteristics, they are more closely related to African wild asses.

Donkeys were brought to Australia in 1866 for use as pack and haulage animals. Up until that point, the Australians had been using the horse as their main mode of transportation. However, problems arose when the horses used in transportation began to become sickened by some of the native poisonous plants. When donkeys proved to be invulnerable to the plants that were making the horses sick, more donkeys were brought in. Escape was common because of the lack of fences, and there were reported herds of donkeys by the 1920s. In western Australia in 1949, there were enough donkeys for them to officially be declared a pest. There were almost 5 million feral donkeys in Australia in 2005.

== Food sources ==
Donkeys are herbivores; as such, they only eat vegetation. All year round, the donkeys graze for grass, shrubs, and tree bark. Donkeys usually graze for 6 to 7 hours a day and can go a fair distance from water sources. There are over 5 million donkeys living in Australia, which means that the donkeys eat a significant amount of vegetation. The donkeys can readily find food in winter if it is wet; however, food is much less plentiful in times of drought.

== Ecological effect ==
The ecological effects of feral donkeys in Australia are debated. Some researchers claim that the donkeys’ ecological niche, like that of other introduced large herbivores, may correspond to lost niches of extinct Australian megafauna and benefit the native ecosystem. In Kimberley, Chris Henggeler has claimed the use of feral donkeys in holistic management of his Kachana station controls dry vegetation in rocky areas and so limit wild fires. Many scientists dispute such claims.

There are some negative effects that feral donkeys may have on the environment: they may spread weeds by carrying seeds in their hair and faeces, they may damage vegetation through overeating, they may foul watering holes in the drought season, and they can cause erosion with their hard hooves. These damages, particularly those to watering holes, may play a role in the extinction of native plants and animals. Feral donkeys also affect local agriculture, as they sometimes overeat pasture grasses and destroy fences. They are also known to infect domestic animals with diseases.

== Control ==
Since feral donkeys in Australia are considered a pest, they are often controlled by being mustered. Helicopters with highly trained and accredited shooters have replaced this technique in places where the terrain makes mustering too difficult. Also seeing some limited use is fertility control. This, however, is difficult with large numbers of undomesticated animals and it is unknown whether this technique will make a difference on such a large number of animals. Some good cattle breeders are using donkeys against dingos and foxes. There is some trafficking of donkey skin for making donkey-hide gelatin in traditional Chinese medicine.

== See also ==
- Australian feral camel
