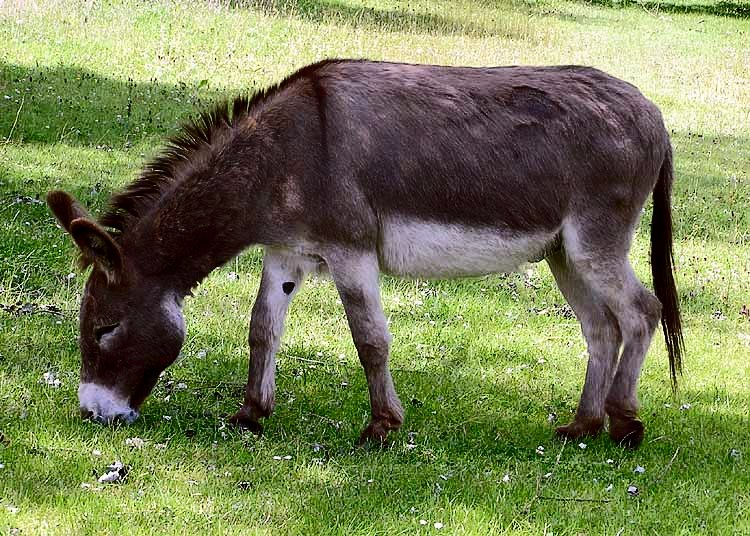
- A donkey in Clovelly, North Devon

Conservation status
- Domesticated

Scientific classification
- Kingdom: Animalia
- Phylum: Chordata
- Class: Mammalia
- Order: Perissodactyla
- Family: Equidae
- Genus: Equus
- Species: E. africanus
- Subspecies: E. a. asinus

Trinomial name
- Equus africanus asinus Linnaeus, 1758

= Donkey =

Domesticated animal primarily used for transportation

The donkey, ass, or burro is a domesticated equine. It derives from the African wild ass, Equus africanus, and may be classified either as a subspecies thereof, Equus africanus asinus, or as a separate species, Equus asinus. It was domesticated in Africa some 5000–7000 years ago, and has been used mainly as a working animal since that time.

There are more than 40 million donkeys in the world, mostly in underdeveloped countries, where they are used principally as draught or pack animals. While working donkeys are often associated with those living at or below subsistence, small numbers of donkeys or asses are kept for breeding, as pets, and for livestock protection in developed countries.

An adult male donkey is a jack or jackass, an adult female is a jenny, jenny ass, or jennet, and an immature donkey of either sex is a foal. Jacks are often mated with female horses (mares) to produce mules; the less common hybrid of a male horse (stallion) and jenny is a hinny.

== Nomenclature ==
Traditionally, the scientific name for the donkey is Equus asinus asinus, on the basis of the principle of priority used for scientific names of animals. However, the International Commission on Zoological Nomenclature ruled in 2003 that if the domestic and the wild species are considered subspecies of a common species, the scientific name of the wild species has priority, even when that subspecies was described after the domestic subspecies. This means that the proper scientific name for the donkey is Equus africanus asinus when it is considered a subspecies and Equus asinus when it is considered a species.

At one time, the synonym ass was the more common term for the donkey. The first recorded use of donkey was in either 1784 or 1785. While the word ass has cognates in most other Indo-European languages, donkey is an etymologically obscure word for which no credible cognate has been identified. Hypotheses on its derivation include the following:

- perhaps from Spanish for its don-like gravity; the donkey was also known as "the King of Spain's trumpeter".
- perhaps a diminutive of dun (dull grayish-brown), a typical donkey colour.
- perhaps from the name Duncan.
- perhaps of imitative origin.

From the 18th century, donkey gradually replaced ass and jenny replaced she-ass, which is now considered archaic. The change may have come about through a tendency to avoid pejorative terms in speech and may be comparable to the substitution in North American English of rooster for cock. By the end of the 17th century, changes in pronunciation of both ass and arse had caused them to become homophones in some varieties of English. Other words used for the ass in English from this time include cuddy in Scotland, neddy in southwestern England and dicky in southeastern England; moke is documented in the 19th century and may be of Welsh or Romani origin.

Burro is a word for donkey in both Spanish and Portuguese. In the United States, it is commonly applied to the feral donkeys that live west of the Rocky Mountains; it may also refer to any small donkey.

== History ==
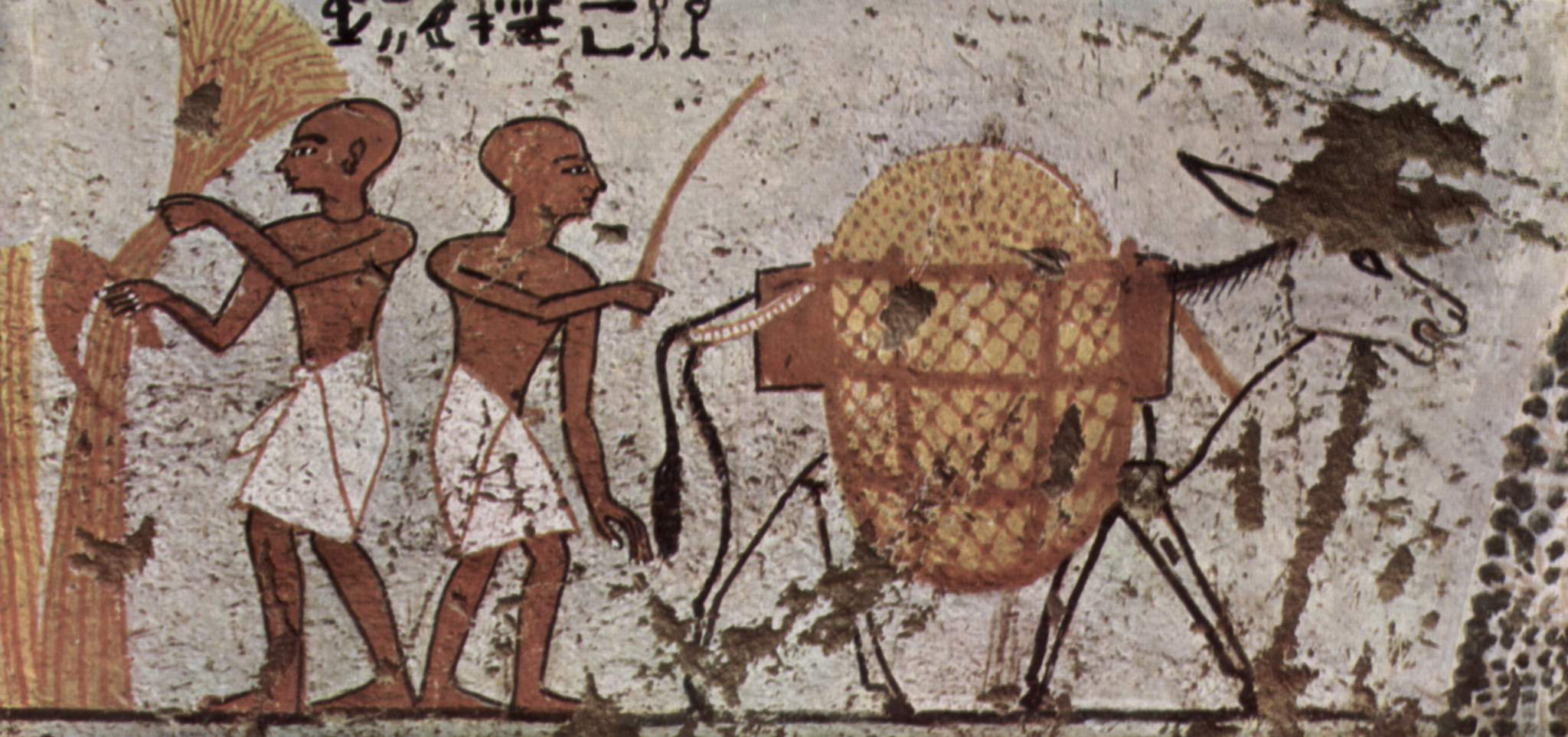
Donkey in an Egyptian painting c. 1298–1235 BC

The genus Equus, which includes all extant equines, is believed to have evolved from Dinohippus, via the intermediate form Plesippus. One of the oldest species is Equus simplicidens, described as zebra-like with a donkey-shaped head. The oldest fossil to date is approximately 3.5 million years old, and was located in the US state of Idaho. The genus appears to have spread quickly into the Old World, with the similarly aged Equus livenzovensis documented from western Europe and Russia.

Molecular phylogenies indicate the most recent common ancestor of all modern equids (members of the genus Equus) lived ~5.6 (3.9–7.8) mya. Direct paleogenomic sequencing of a 700,000-year-old middle Pleistocene horse metapodial bone from Canada implies a more recent 4.07 Myr before present date for the most recent common ancestor (MRCA) within the range of 4.0 to 4.5 Myr BP. The oldest divergencies are the Asian hemiones (subgenus E. (Asinus), including the kulan, onager, and kiang), followed by the African zebras (subgenera E. (Dolichohippus), and E. (Hippotigris)). All other modern forms including the domesticated horse (and many fossil Pliocene and Pleistocene forms) belong to the subgenus E. (Equus) which diverged ~4.8 (3.2–6.5) million years ago.

The ancestors of the modern donkey are the Nubian and Somalian subspecies of African wild ass. Remains of domestic donkeys dating to the fourth millennium BC have been found in Ma'adi in Lower Egypt, and it is believed that the domestication of the donkey was accomplished long after the domestication of cattle, sheep and goats in the seventh and eighth millennia BC. Donkeys were probably first domesticated by pastoral people in Nubia, and they supplanted the ox as the chief pack animal of that culture. Genetic evidence indicates that the Cushitic-speaking peoples in the Horn of Africa and along the Red Sea Hills separately domesticated the animal, and the earliest archaeological evidence for donkeys in the Horn of Africa was found at Mezber. The domestication of donkeys served to increase the mobility of pastoral cultures, having the advantage over ruminants of not needing time to chew their cud, and were vital in the development of long-distance trade across Egypt. In the Dynasty IV era of Egypt, between 2675 and 2565 BC, wealthy members of society were known to own over 1,000 donkeys, employed in agriculture, as dairy and meat animals and as pack animals. In 2003, the tomb of either King Narmer or King Hor-Aha (two of the first Egyptian pharaohs) was excavated and the skeletons of ten donkeys were found buried in a manner usually used with high ranking humans. These burials show the importance of donkeys to the early Egyptian state and its ruler.

By the end of the fourth millennium BC, the donkey had spread to Southwest Asia, and the main breeding centre had shifted to Mesopotamia by 1800 BC. The breeding of large, white riding asses made Damascus famous, while Syrian breeders developed at least three other breeds, including one preferred by women for its easy gait. The Muscat or Yemen ass was developed in Arabia. By the second millennium BC, the donkey was brought to Europe, possibly at the same time as viticulture was introduced, as the donkey is associated with the Syrian god of wine, Dionysus. Greeks spread both of these to many of their colonies, including those in what are now Italy, France and Spain; Romans dispersed them throughout their empire.

The first donkeys came to the Americas on ships of the Second Voyage of Christopher Columbus, and were landed at Hispaniola in 1495. The first to reach North America may have been two animals taken to Mexico by Juan de Zumárraga, the first bishop of Mexico, who arrived there on 6 December 1528, while the first donkeys to reach what is now the United States may have crossed the Rio Grande with Juan de Oñate in April 1598. From that time on they spread northward, finding use in missions and mines. Donkeys were documented as present in what today is Arizona in 1679. By the Gold Rush years of the 19th century, the burro was the beast of burden of choice of early prospectors in the western United States. By the end of the placer mining boom, many of them escaped or were abandoned, and a feral population established itself.

=== Conservation ===
Live donkeys

There are almost 54 million donkeys worldwide as of 2024, with the most populous countries being Ethiopia (10.8 million), Sudan (7.76 million), and Pakistan (5.9 million).

About 41 million donkeys were reported worldwide in 2006. China had the most with 11 million, followed by Pakistan, Ethiopia and Mexico. As of 2017, however, the Chinese population was reported to have dropped to 3 million, with African populations under pressure as well, due to increasing trade and demand for donkey products in China. Some researchers believe the actual number may be somewhat higher since many donkeys go uncounted. The number of breeds and percentage of world population for each of the FAO's world regions was in 2006:

Region	No. of breeds	% of world pop.
Africa	26	26.9
Asia and Pacific	32	37.6
Europe and the Caucasus	51	3.7
Latin America and the Caribbean	24	19.9
Near and Middle East	47	11.8
United States and Canada	5	0.1
World	185	41 million head

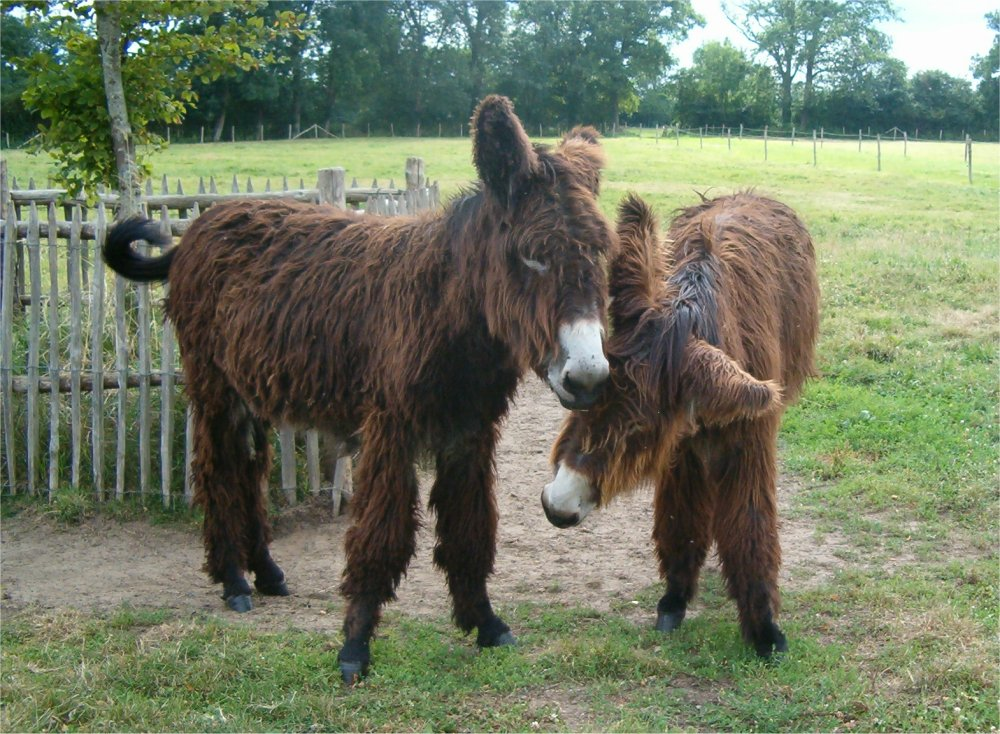
The Baudet du Poitou is among the largest breeds of donkey

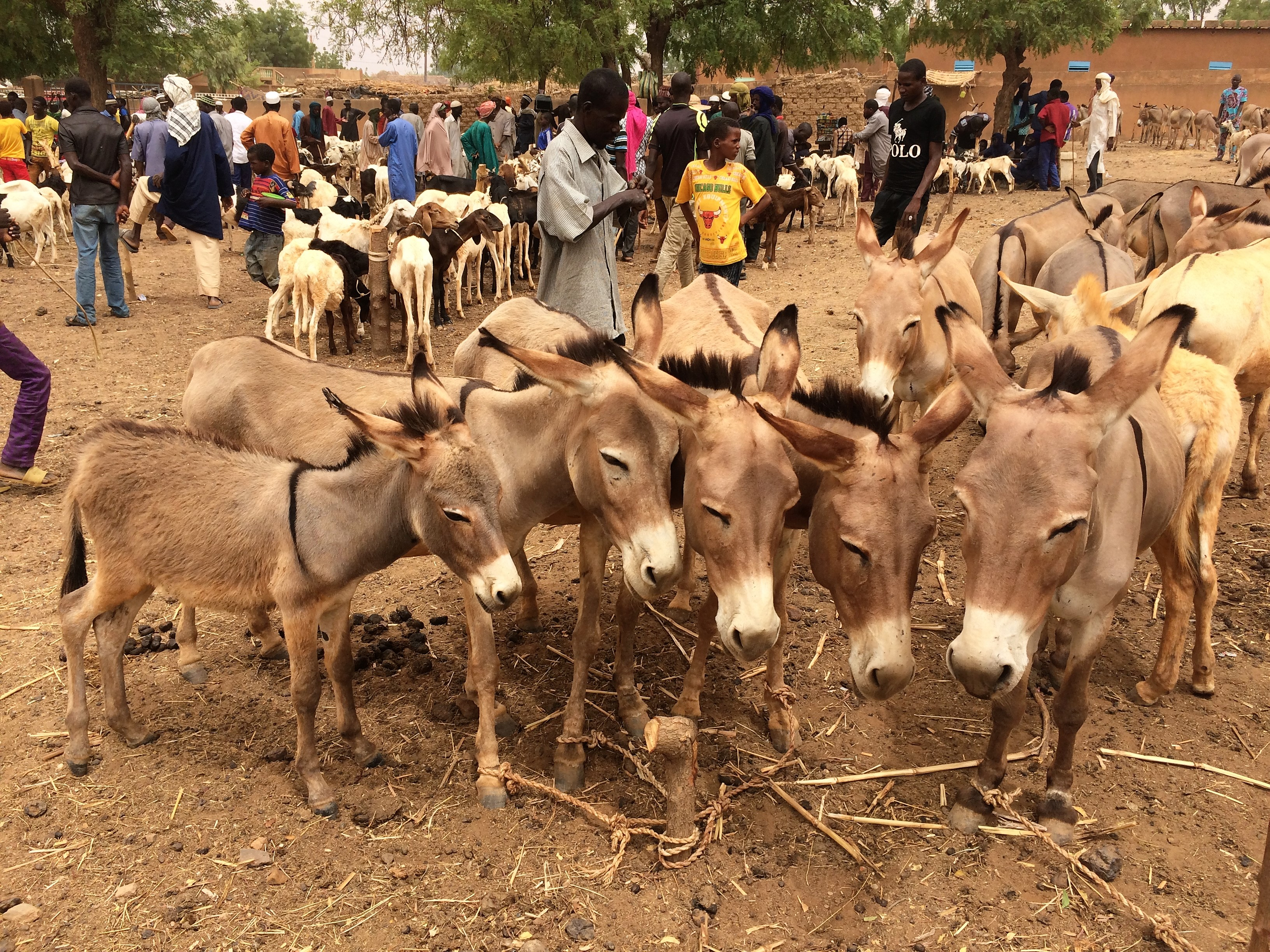
At a livestock market in Niger

In 1997, the number of donkeys in the world was reported to be continuing to grow, as it had steadily done throughout most of history; factors cited as contributing to this were increasing human population, progress in economic development and social stability in some poorer nations, conversion of forests to farm and range land, rising prices of motor vehicles and fuel, and the popularity of donkeys as pets. Since then, the world population of donkeys is reported to be rapidly shrinking, falling from 43.7 million to 43.5 million between 1995 and 2000, and to only 41 million in 2006. The fall in population is pronounced in developed countries; in Europe, the total number of donkeys fell from 3 million in 1944 to just over 1 million in 1994.

The Domestic Animal Diversity Information System (DAD-IS) of the FAO listed 189 breeds of ass in June 2011. In 2000 the number of breeds of donkey recorded worldwide was 97, and in 1995 it was 77. The rapid increase is attributed to attention paid to identification and recognition of donkey breeds by the FAO's Animal Genetic Resources project. The rate of recognition of new breeds has been particularly high in some developed countries. In France only one breed, the Baudet du Poitou, was recognised until the early 1990s; by 2005, a further six donkey breeds had official recognition.

In developed countries, the welfare of donkeys both at home and abroad has become a concern, and a number of sanctuaries for retired and rescued donkeys have been set up. The largest is The Donkey Sanctuary near Sidmouth, England, which also supports donkey welfare projects in Egypt, Ethiopia, India, Kenya, and Mexico.

In 2017, a drop in the number of Chinese donkeys, combined with the fact that they are slow to reproduce, meant that Chinese suppliers began to look to Africa. As a result of the increase in demand, and the price that could be charged, Kenya opened three donkey abattoirs. Concerns for donkeys' well-being have resulted in a number of African countries (including Uganda, Tanzania, Botswana, Niger, Burkina Faso, Mali, and Senegal) banning China from buying their donkey products.

In 2019, The Donkey Sanctuary warned that the global donkey population could be reduced by half over the next half decade as the demand for ejiao increases in China.

== Characteristics ==
Donkeys vary considerably in size, depending on both breed and environmental conditions, and heights at the withers range from less than 90 centimetres (35 in) to approximately 150 cm (59 in). Working donkeys in the poorest countries have a life expectancy of 12 to 15 years; in more prosperous countries, they may have a lifespan of 30 to 50 years.

Donkeys are adapted to marginal desert lands. Unlike wild and feral horses, wild donkeys in dry areas are solitary and do not form harems. Each adult donkey establishes a home range; breeding over a large area may be dominated by one jack. The loud call or bray of the donkey, which typically lasts for twenty seconds and can be heard for over three kilometres, may help keep in contact with other donkeys over the wide spaces of the desert. Donkeys have large ears, which may pick up more distant sounds, and may help cool the donkey's blood. Donkeys can defend themselves by biting, striking with the front hooves or kicking with the hind legs. Their vocalization, called a bray, is often represented in English as "hee haw".

=== Cross on back ===
Most donkeys have dorsal and shoulder stripes, primitive markings which form a distinctive cross pattern on their backs.

=== Breeding ===
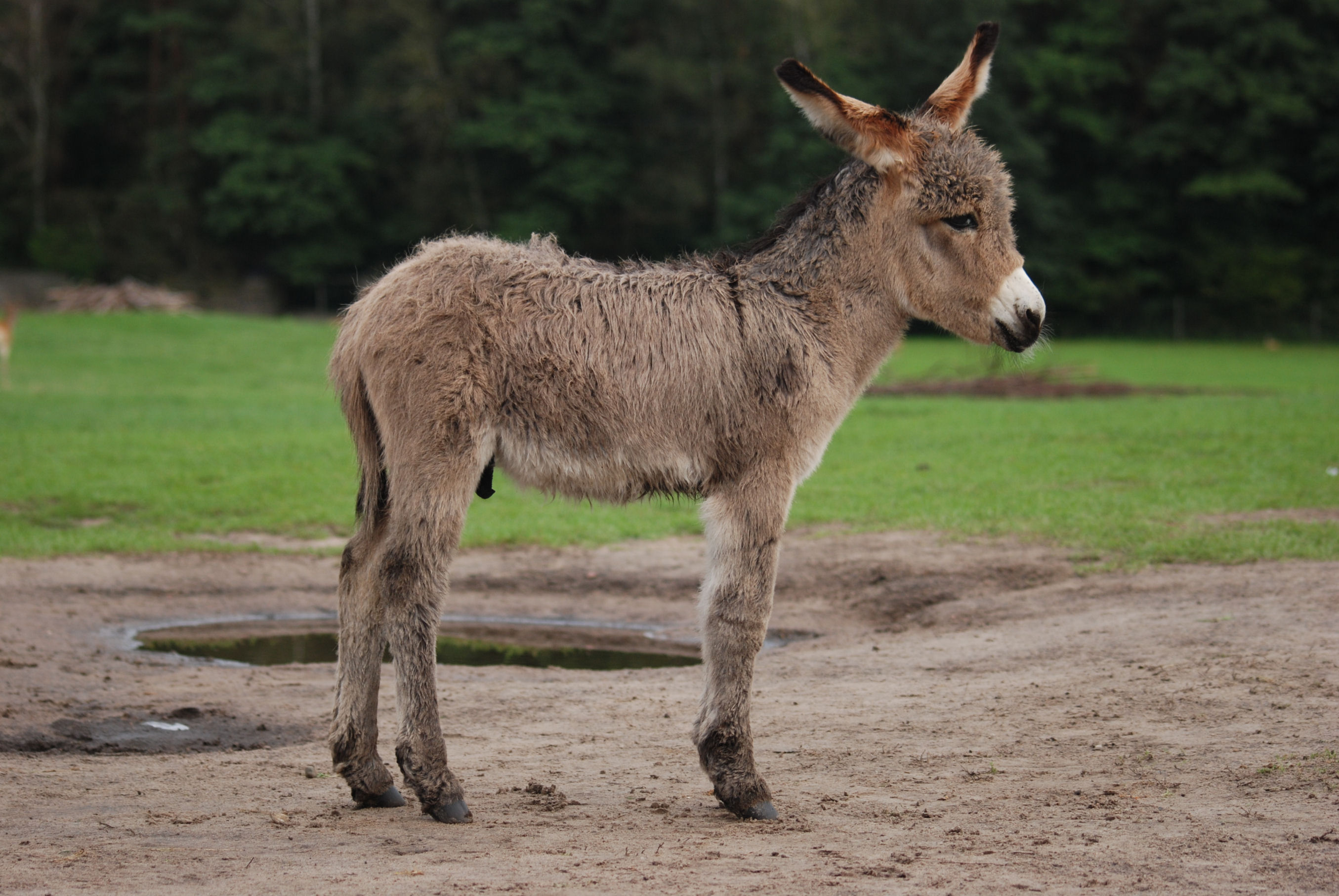
A three-week-old donkey foal

A jenny is normally pregnant for about 12 months, though the gestation period varies from 11 to 14 months, and usually gives birth to a single foal. Births of twins are rare, though less so than in horses. About 1.7 percent of donkey pregnancies result in twins; both foals survive in about 14 percent of those. In general jennies have a conception rate that is lower than that of horses (i.e., less than the 60–65% rate for mares).

Although jennies come into heat within 9 or 10 days of giving birth, their fertility remains low, and it is likely the reproductive tract has not returned to normal. Thus it is usual to wait one or two further oestrous cycles before rebreeding, unlike the practice with mares. Jennies are usually very protective of their foals, and some will not come into estrus while they have a foal at side. The time lapse involved in rebreeding, and the length of a jenny's gestation, means that a jenny will have fewer than one foal per year. Because of this and the longer gestation period, donkey breeders do not expect to obtain a foal every year, as horse breeders often do, but may plan for three foals in four years.

Donkeys can interbreed with other members of the family Equidae, and are commonly interbred with horses. The hybrid between a jack and a mare is a mule, valued as a working and riding animal in many countries. Some large donkey breeds such as the Asino di Martina Franca, the Baudet du Poitou and the Mammoth Jack are raised only for mule production. The hybrid between a stallion and a jenny is a hinny, and is less common. Like other inter-species hybrids, mules and hinnies are usually sterile. Donkeys can also breed with zebras, in which case the offspring is called a zonkey (among other names).

=== Behaviour ===
Donkeys have a notorious reputation for stubbornness, but this has been attributed to a much stronger sense of self-preservation than exhibited by horses. Likely based on a stronger prey instinct and a weaker connection with humans, it is considerably more difficult to force or frighten a donkey into doing something it perceives to be dangerous for whatever reason. Once a person has earned their confidence they can be willing and companionable partners and very dependable in work.

Although formal studies of their behaviour and cognition are rather limited, donkeys appear to be quite intelligent, cautious, friendly, playful, and eager to learn.

== Uses ==
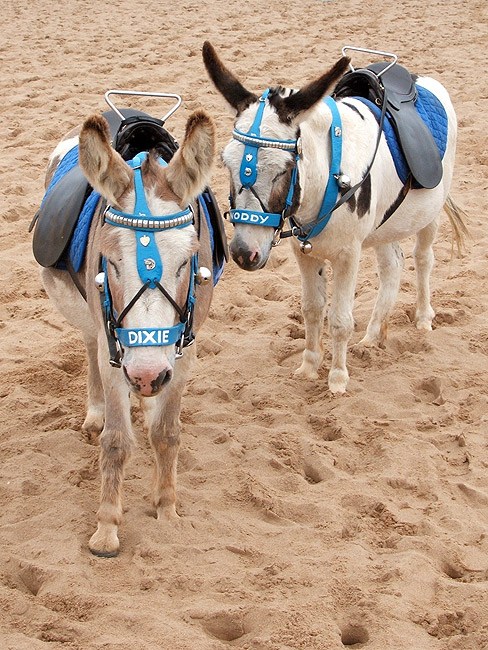
Classic British seaside donkeys in Skegness

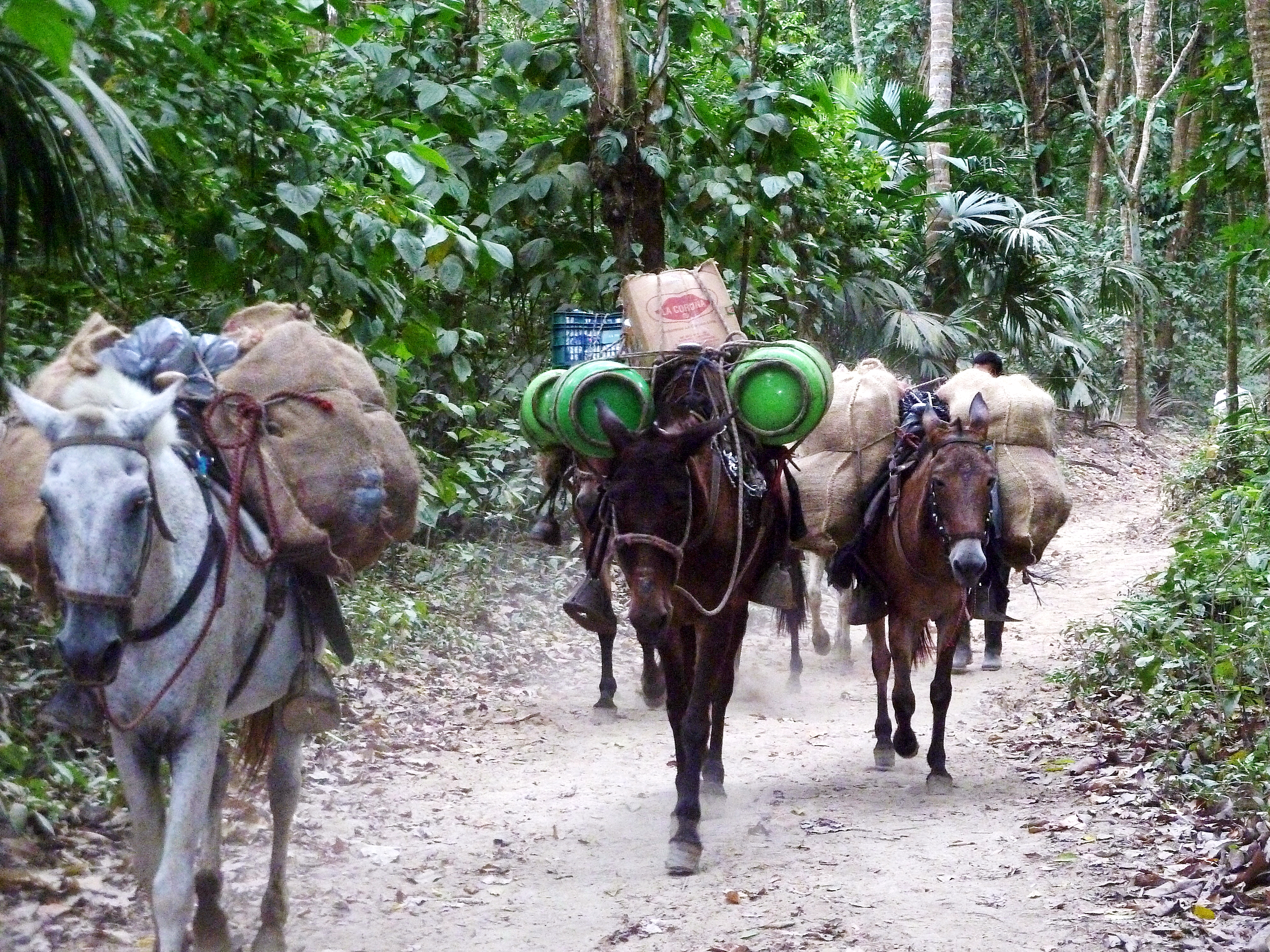
Pack donkeys in Tayrona National Natural Park in northern Colombia

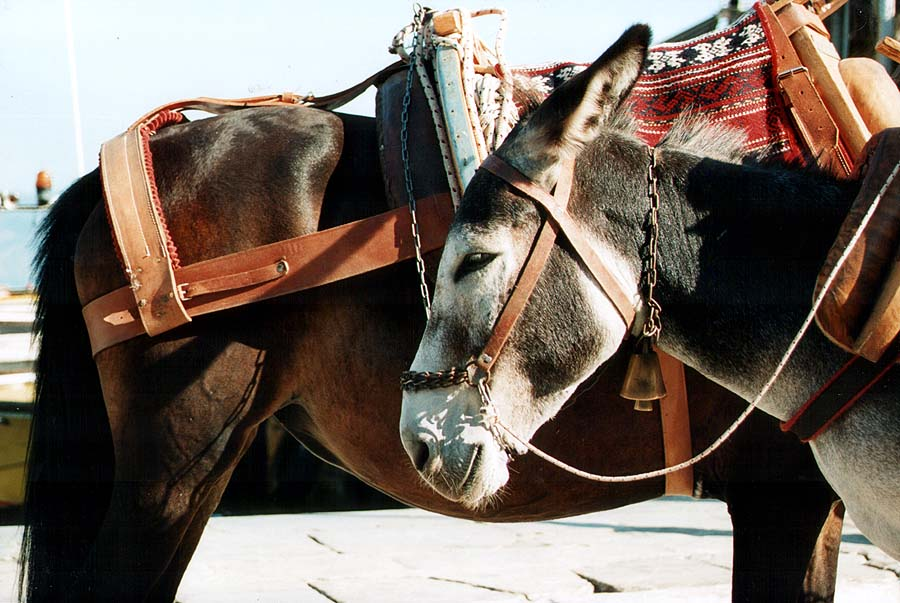
Donkeys for transport on the island of Hydra

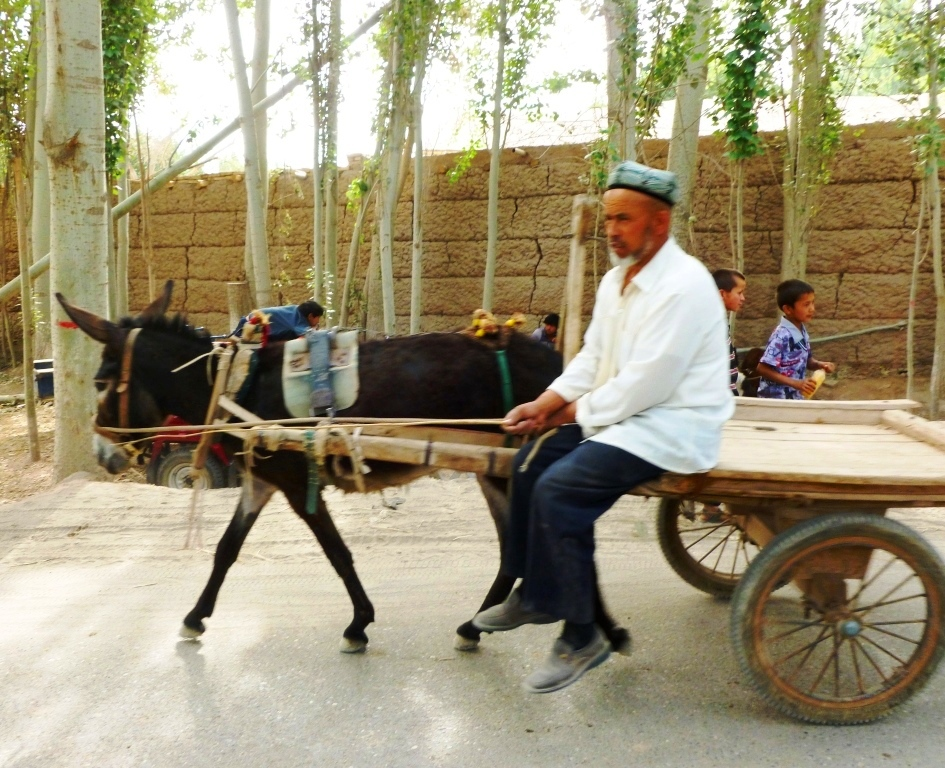
Uyghur man on his donkey cart. Kashgar

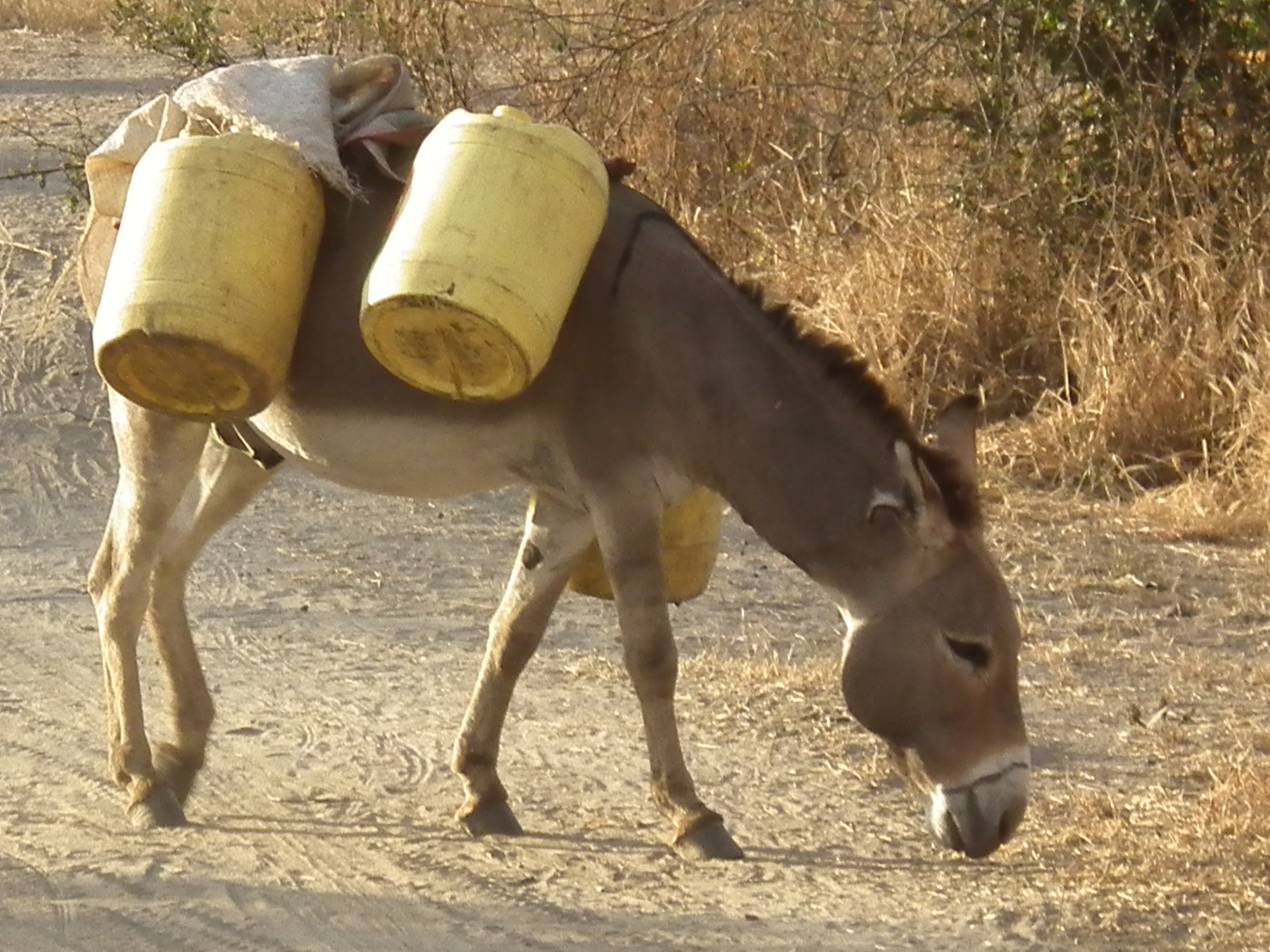
A donkey in Tanzania.

The donkey has been used as a working animal for at least 5000 years. Of the more than 40 million donkeys in the world, about 96% are in underdeveloped countries, where they are used principally as pack animals or for draught work in transport or agriculture. After human labour, the donkey is the cheapest form of agricultural power. They may also be ridden, or used for threshing, raising water, milling and other work. Some cultures that prohibit women from working with oxen in agriculture do not extend this taboo to donkeys.

In developed countries where their use as beasts of burden has disappeared, donkeys are used to sire mules, to guard sheep, for donkey rides for children or tourists, and as pets. Donkeys may be pastured or stabled with horses and ponies, and are thought to have a calming effect on nervous horses. If a donkey is introduced to a mare and foal, the foal may turn to the donkey for support after it has been weaned from its mother.

In the United States, Canada, and Australia, donkeys are used as livestock guard animals for smaller livestock such as sheep. When working as livestock guard animals, also called predator control animals or mobile flock protectors, donkeys will bray loudly and attack potential predators by kicking out with their front hooves. In 2019, donkeys comprised 14.2% of livestock guard animals in the United States.

A few donkeys are milked or raised for meat. Approximately 3.5 million donkeys and mules are slaughtered each year for meat worldwide. In Italy, which has the highest consumption of equine meat in Europe and where donkey meat is the main ingredient of several regional dishes, about 1,000 donkeys were slaughtered in 2010, yielding approximately 100 tonnes (98 long tons; 110 short tons) of meat. Asses' milk may command good prices: the average price in Italy in 2009 was €15 per litre, and a price of €6 per 100 ml was reported from Croatia in 2008; it is used for soaps and cosmetics as well as dietary purposes. The niche markets for both milk and meat are expanding. In the past, donkey skin was used in the production of parchment. In 2017, the UK based charity The Donkey Sanctuary estimated that 1.8 million skins were traded every year, but the demand could be as high as 10 million.

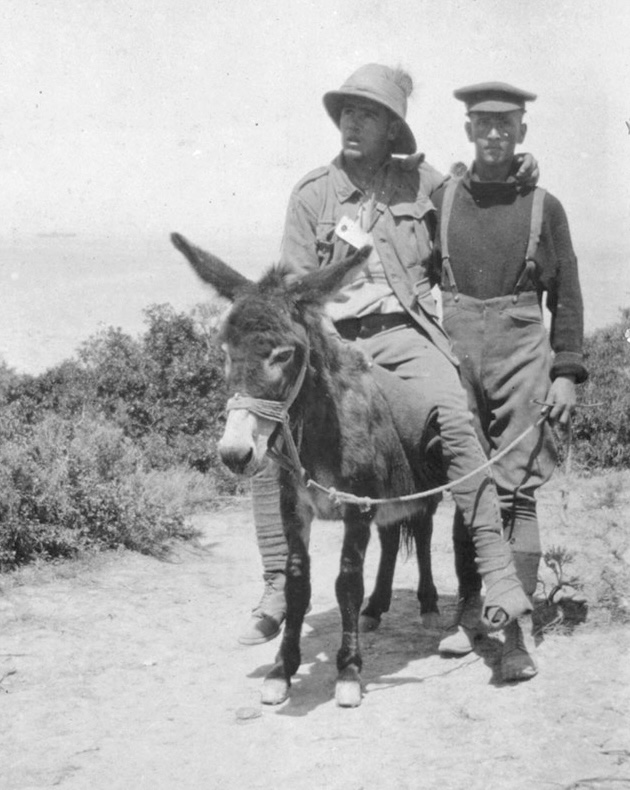
Lt. Richard Alexander "Dick" Henderson using a donkey to carry a wounded soldier at the Battle of Gallipoli

In China, donkey meat is considered a delicacy with some restaurants specializing in such dishes, and Guo Li Zhuang restaurants offer the genitals of donkeys in dishes. Donkey-hide gelatin is produced by soaking and stewing the hide to make a traditional Chinese medicine product. Ejiao, the gelatine produced by boiling donkey skins, can sell for up to $388 per kilogram, at October 2017 prices.

=== In warfare ===
During World War I John Simpson Kirkpatrick, a British stretcher bearer serving with the Australian and New Zealand Army Corps, and Richard Alexander "Dick" Henderson of the New Zealand Medical Corps used donkeys to rescue wounded soldiers from the battlefield at Gallipoli.

According to British food writer Matthew Fort, donkeys were used in the Italian Army. The Mountain Fusiliers each had a donkey to carry their gear, and in extreme circumstances the animal could be eaten.

Donkeys have also been used to carry explosives in conflicts that include the war in Afghanistan and others. In 2025 Donkeys were issued to Russian forces participating in the invasion of Ukraine to ferry supplies, with Russian officials stating logistical issues as the reason.

== Care ==
=== Shoeing ===
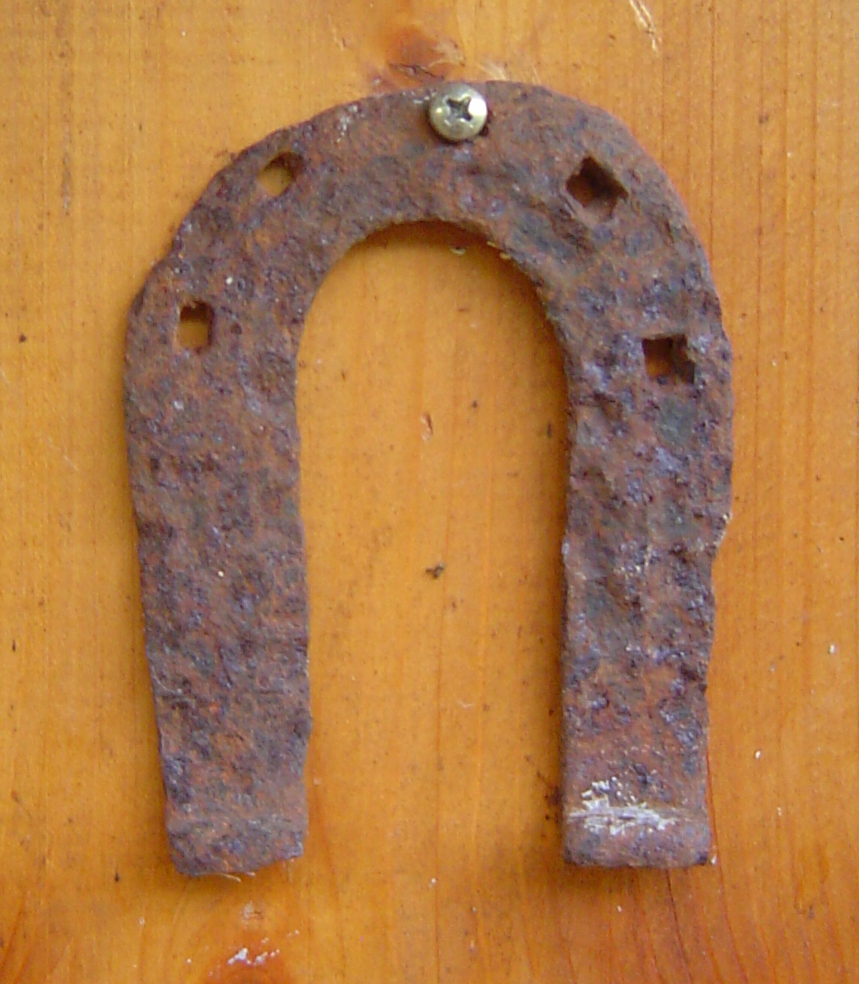
A donkey shoe with calkins

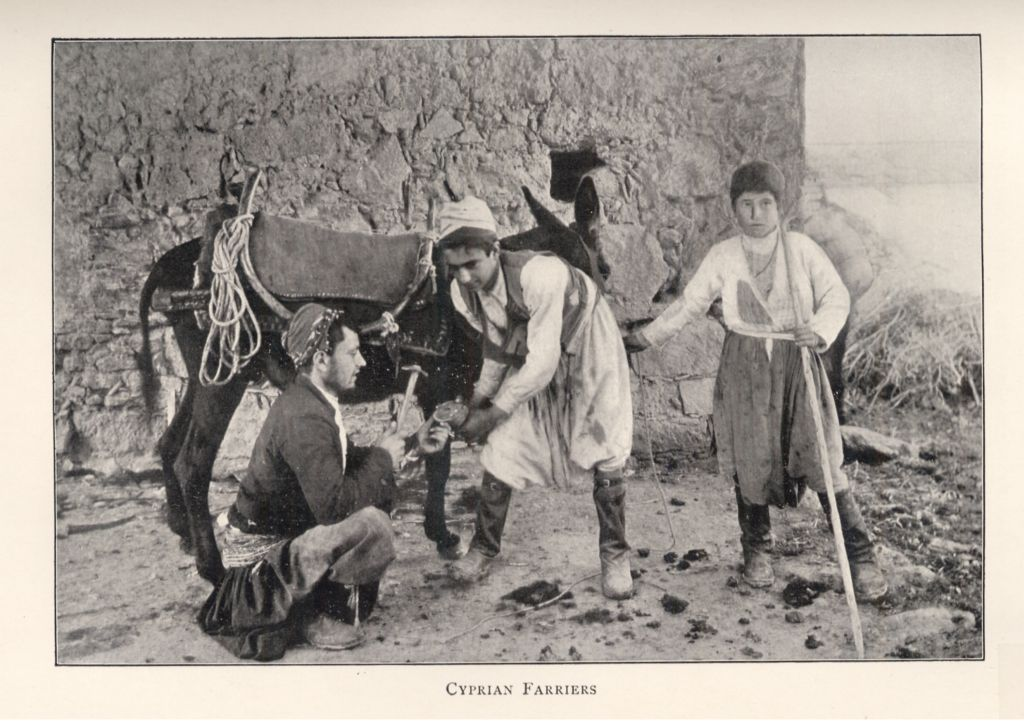
Farriers shoeing a donkey in Cyprus in 1900

Donkey hooves are more elastic than those of horses, and do not naturally wear down as fast. Regular clipping may be required; neglect can lead to permanent damage. Working donkeys may need to be shod. Donkey shoes are similar to horseshoes, but usually smaller and without toe-clips.

=== Nutrition ===
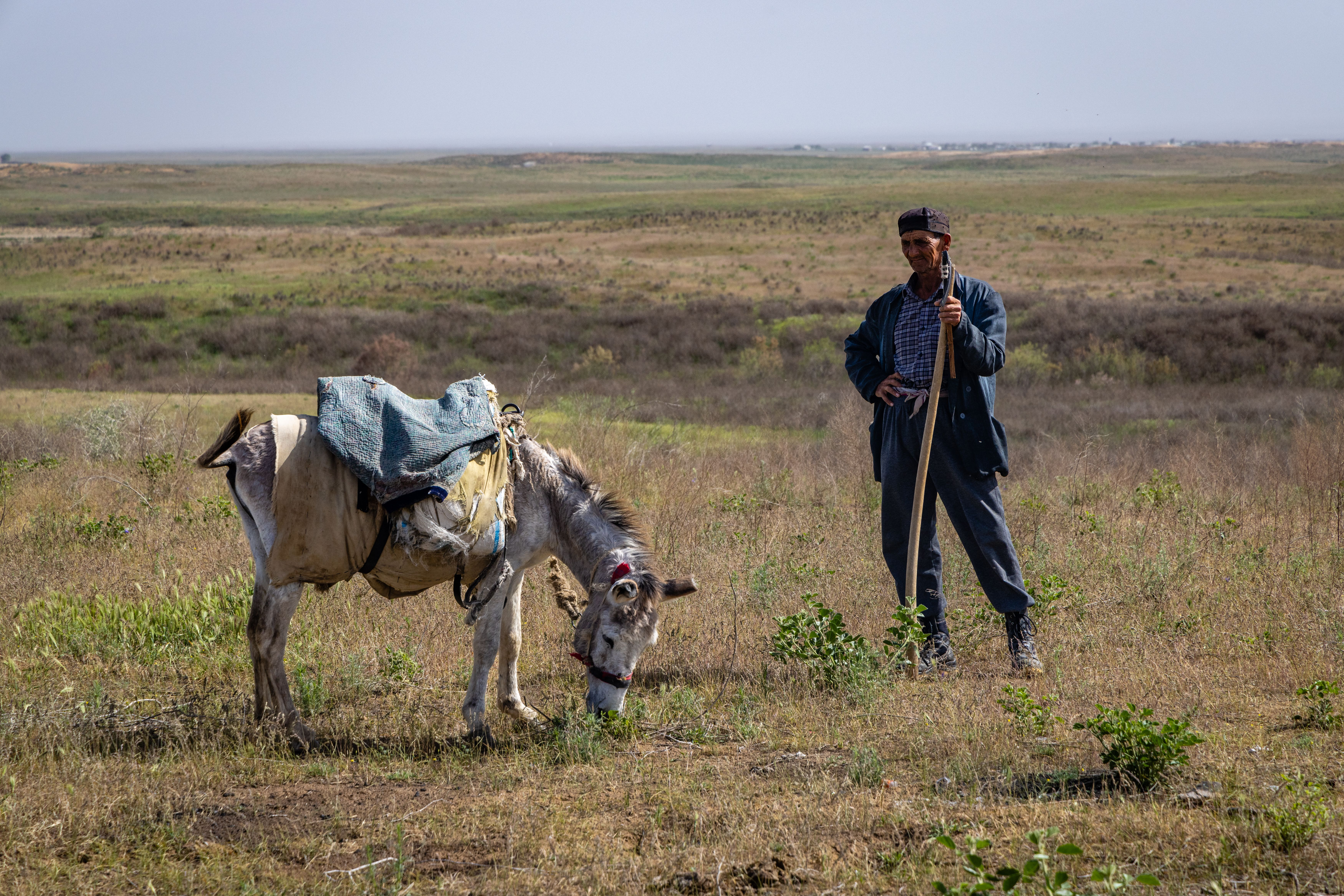
Local man watching his donkey graze near the Aidarkul Lake an artificial lake in Uzbekistan. Donkeys are particularly well suited for grazing in dryland environments.

In their native arid and semi-arid climates, donkeys spend more than half of each day foraging and feeding, often on poor quality scrub. The donkey has a tough digestive system in which roughage is efficiently broken down by hind gut fermentation, microbial action in the caecum and large intestine. While there is no marked structural difference between the gastro-intestinal tract of a donkey and that of a horse, the digestion of the donkey is more efficient. It needs less food than a horse or pony of comparable height and weight, approximately 1.5 percent of body weight per day in dry matter, compared to the 2–2.5 percent consumption rate possible for a horse. Donkeys are also less prone to colic. The reasons for this difference are not fully understood; the donkey may have different intestinal flora to the horse, or a longer gut retention time.

Donkeys obtain most of their energy from structural carbohydrates. Some suggest that a donkey needs to be fed only straw (preferably barley straw), supplemented with controlled grazing in the summer or hay in the winter, to get all the energy, protein, fat and vitamins it requires; others recommend some grain to be fed, particularly to working animals, and others advise against feeding straw. They do best when allowed to consume small amounts of food over long periods. They can meet their nutritional needs on 6 to 7 hours of grazing per day on average dryland pasture that is not stressed by drought. If they are worked long hours or do not have access to pasture, they require hay or a similar dried forage, with no more than a 1:4 ratio of legumes to grass. They also require salt and mineral supplements, and access to clean, fresh water. In temperate climates the forage available is often too abundant and too rich; over-feeding may cause weight gain and obesity, and lead to metabolic disorders such as founder (laminitis) and hyperlipaemia, or to gastric ulcers.

Throughout the world, working donkeys are associated with the very poor, with those living at or below subsistence level. Few receive adequate food, and in general donkeys throughout the Third World are under-nourished and over-worked.

== Feral populations ==
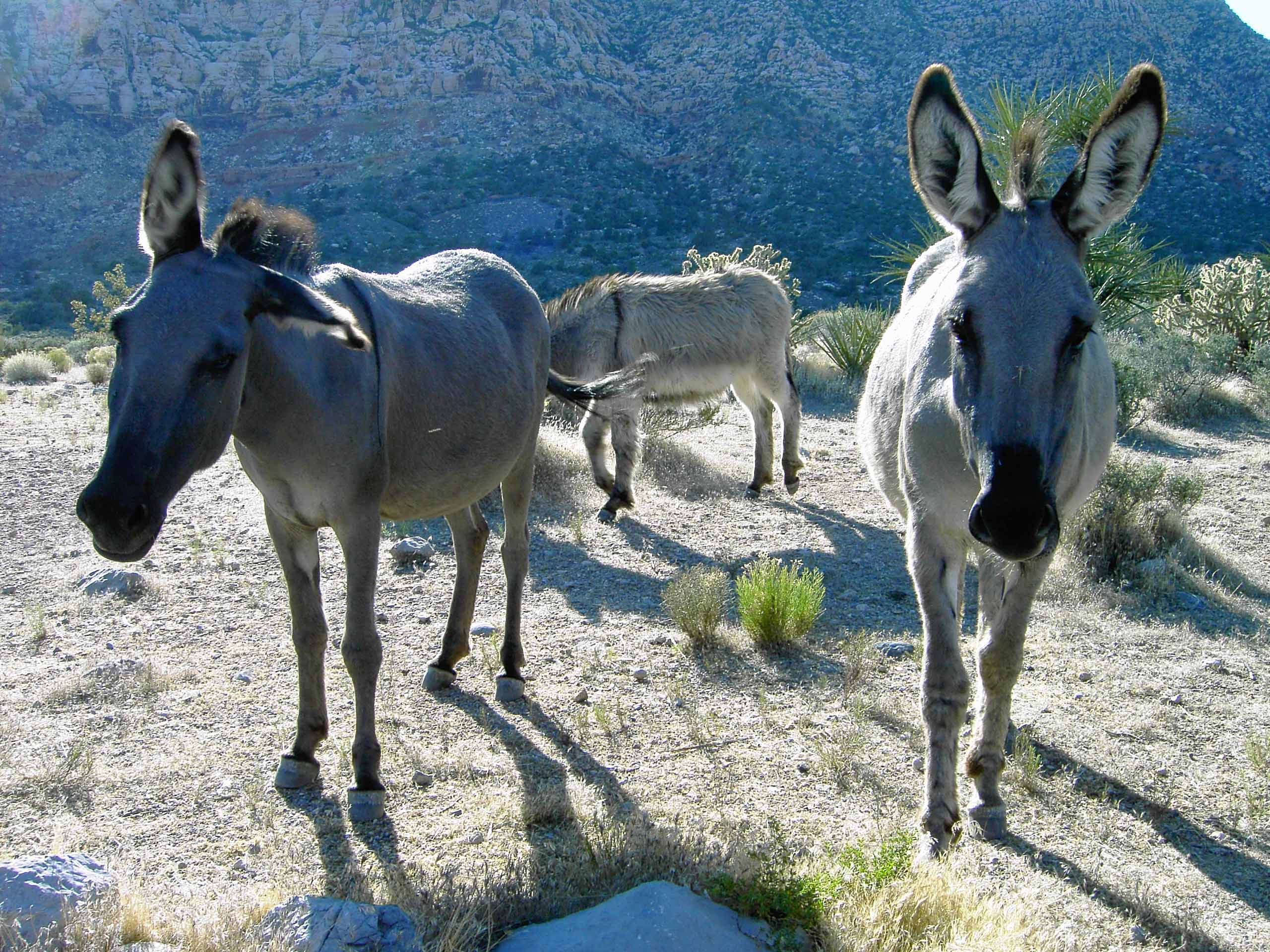
Feral burros in Red Rock Canyon

In some areas domestic donkeys have returned to the wild and established feral populations such as those of the burro of North America and the Asinara donkey of Sardinia, Italy, both of which have protected status. Feral donkeys can also cause problems, notably in environments that have evolved free of any form of equid, such as Hawaii. There is a small community of feral donkeys on St. John, U.S. Virgin Islands, that descend from the animals brought by Danish colonists for agricultural work. While they add to the island's charm, they also cause issues such as vegetation damage and road hazards, leading to population management efforts. In Australia, where there may be 5 million feral donkeys, they are regarded as an invasive pest and have a serious impact on the environment. They may compete with livestock and native animals for resources, spread weeds and diseases, foul or damage watering holes and cause erosion.

== Donkey hybrids ==
The earliest documented donkey hybrid was the kunga, which was used as a draft animal in the Syrian and Mesopotamian kingdoms of the second half of the 3rd millennium BCE. A cross between a captive male Syrian wild ass and a female domesticated donkey (jenny), they represent the earliest known example of human-directed animal hybridization. They were produced at a breeding center at Nagar (modern Tell Brak) and were sold or given as gifts throughout the region, where they became significant status symbols, pulling battle wagons and the chariots of kings, and also being sacrificed to bury with high-status people. They fell out of favor following the introduction of the domestic horse and its donkey hybrid, the mule, into the region at the end of the 3rd millennium BCE.

A male donkey (jack) crossed with a female horse produces a mule, while a male horse crossed with a jenny produces a hinny. Horse–donkey hybrids are almost always sterile because of a failure of their developing gametes to complete meiosis. The lower progesterone production of the jenny may also lead to early embryonic loss. In addition, there are reasons not directly related to reproductive biology. Due to different mating behavior, jacks are often more willing to cover mares than stallions are to breed jennies. Further, mares are usually larger than jennies and thus have more room for the ensuing foal to grow in the womb, resulting in a larger animal at birth. It is commonly believed that mules are more easily handled and also physically stronger than hinnies, making them more desirable for breeders to produce.

The offspring of a zebra–donkey cross is called a zonkey, zebroid, zebrass, or zedonk; zebra mule is an older term, but still used in some regions today. The foregoing terms generally refer to hybrids produced by breeding a male zebra to a female donkey. Zebra hinny, zebret and zebrinny all refer to the cross of a female zebra with a male donkey. Zebrinnies are rarer than zedonkies because female zebras in captivity are most valuable when used to produce full-blooded zebras. There are not enough female zebras breeding in captivity to spare them for hybridizing; there is no such limitation on the number of female donkeys breeding.

== See also ==
- Animal-borne bomb attacks
- Cultural references to donkeys
- Jennet, a type of medieval horse
