= Errentai =

Genre of Chinese opera performed by two singers

- Traditional Chinese: 二人臺
- Simplified Chinese: 二人台
- Literal meaning: Two-person stage
Transcriptions
Standard Mandarin
- Hanyu Pinyin: Èrréntái

Errenban
- Chinese: 二人班
- Literal meaning: Two-person troupe
Transcriptions
Standard Mandarin
- Hanyu Pinyin: Èrrénbān

Dawanyi'er
- Traditional Chinese: 打玩意兒
- Simplified Chinese: 打玩意儿
- Literal meaning: Beat the thingie
Transcriptions
Standard Mandarin
- Hanyu Pinyin: Dǎwányì'ér

Shuangwanyi'er
- Traditional Chinese: 雙玩意兒
- Simplified Chinese: 双玩意儿
- Literal meaning: Double thingie
Transcriptions
Standard Mandarin
- Hanyu Pinyin: Shuāngwányì'ér

Bengbeng
- Chinese: 蹦蹦
- Literal meaning: Hop-hop
Transcriptions
Standard Mandarin
- Hanyu Pinyin: Bèngbèng

Errentai, also known as Errenban, Dawanyi'er, Shuangwanyi'er, and Bengbeng, is a genre of Chinese opera performed by two singers. It is popular in Fugu County and Shenmu County in northern Shaanxi, Hequ County in northwestern Shanxi, Kangbao County in northwestern Hebei, and areas near Baotou, Hohhot, and the Ordos Plateau in Inner Mongolia.

In 2006, errentai was listed as a national-level intangible cultural heritage by the government of China.

== History ==
Errentai traces its history back to the 18th century during the Qing dynasty. It originated in Shanxi and later spread to western Inner Mongolia, Shaanxi, and Hebei. The songs are derived from folk songs; as such, different styles are developed in different areas.

== Performance ==
Errentai is performed by two singers, one acting in the dan (female) role and another in the chou (male clown) role. Traditionally both roles were portrayed by men, but the dan role is typically portrayed by actresses today. The performers would sing back and forth. Stage props include handkerchiefs, folding fans, rattle sticks and paper or silk stripes.

The musical instruments used include the dizi (transverse flute), sihu (four-stringed fiddle), and yangqin (hammered dulcimer). The wood block (梆子; bangzi) and sikuaiwa (四块瓦, a percussion instrument) are also sometimes used.

== See also ==
- Errenzhuan
