= Donkey-hide gelatin =

Gelatin obtained from the skin of the donkey

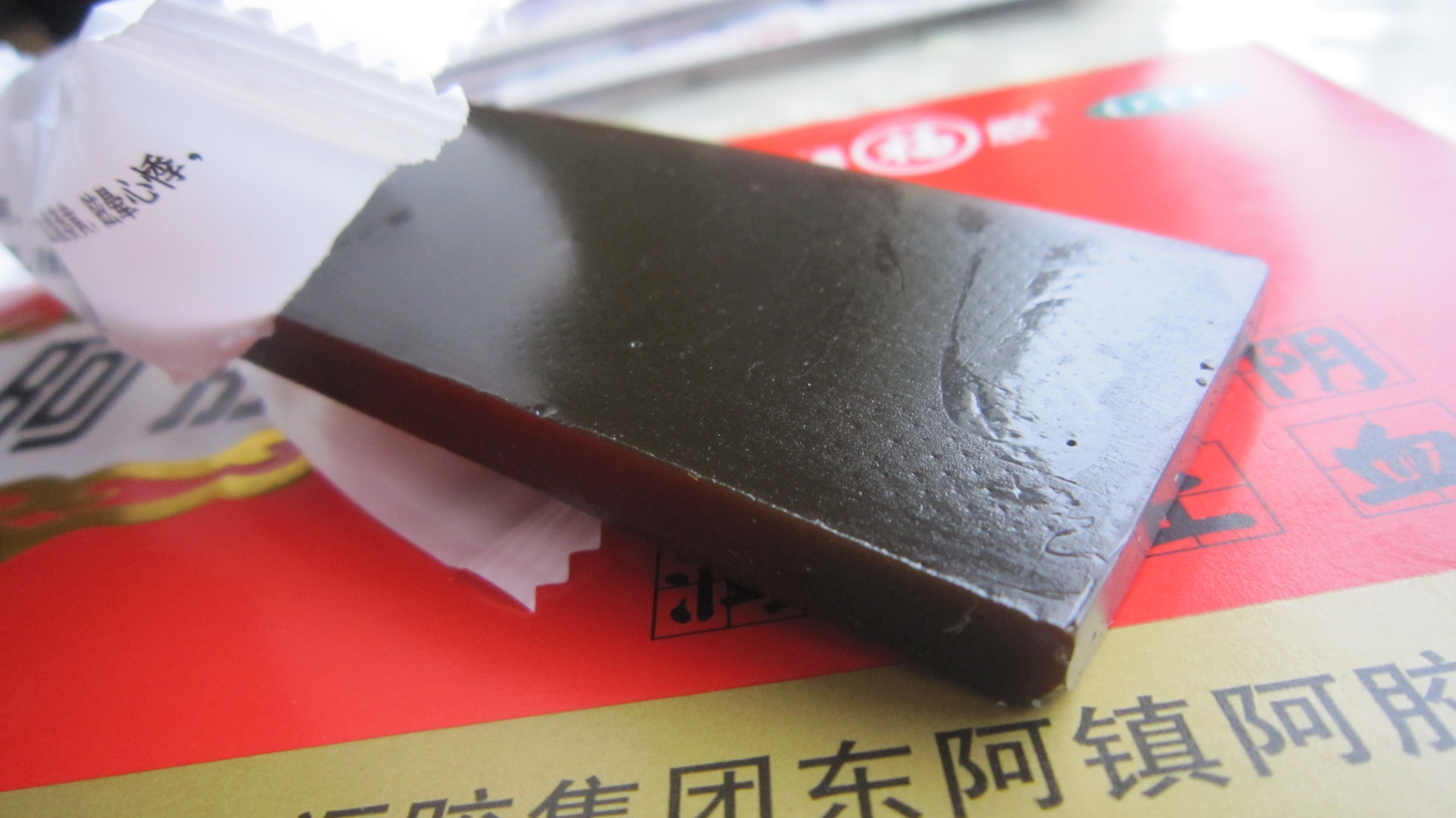
A slab of donkey-hide gelatin

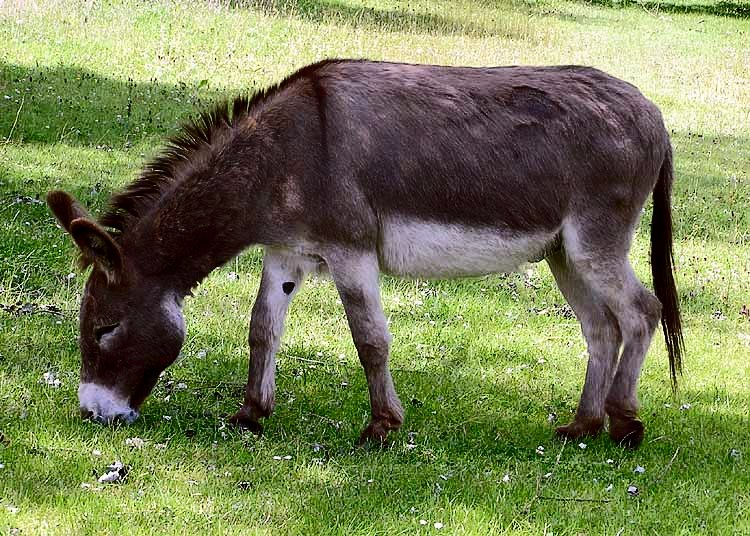
The donkey or ass

Donkey-hide gelatin or ass-hide glue (Latin: colla corii asini) is animal glue obtained from the skin of the donkey (Equus asinus) by soaking and stewing. It is used as an ingredient in traditional Chinese medicine, where it is called ejiao, (Note: simplified Chinese: 阿胶; traditional Chinese: 阿膠; pinyin: ējiāo) meaning "gelatin of Dong'e County".

The gelatin is produced in several coastal provinces of China, including Jiangsu, Zhejiang, and Shandong. Shandong's Dong'e County is the source of the name "ejiao".

According to a ca. 1723 account by the French Jesuit Dominique Parrenin, there was a well in Dong'e which was normally kept closed and sealed, and which was only opened when water was taken to be used in preparation of ejiao for the emperor's court.

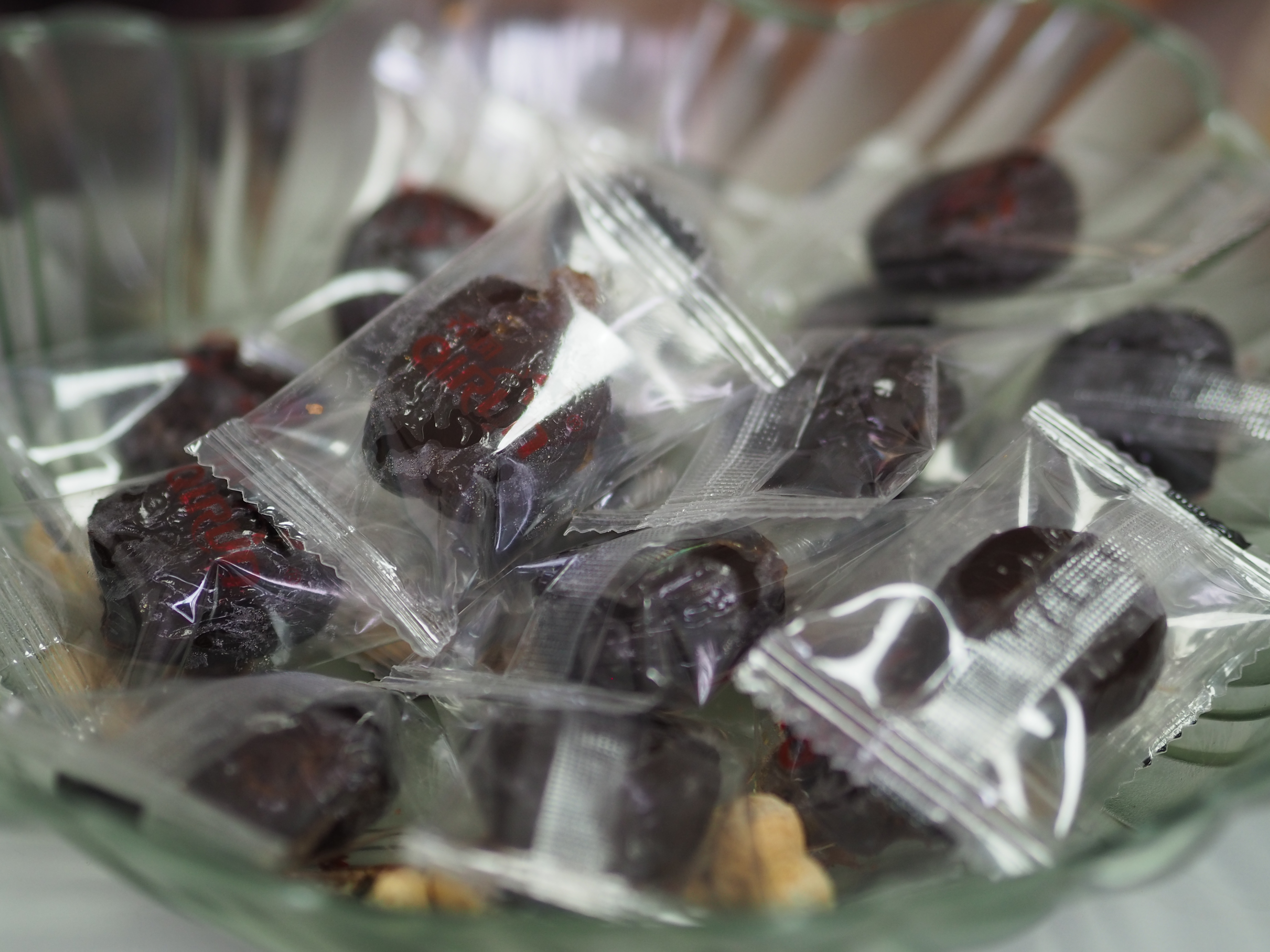
Candied jujubes manufactured with donkey-hide gelatin

Donkey-hide gelatin can also be processed into foods such as donkey-hide gelatin jujube and donkey-hide gelatin cake.

== Manufacture ==
Li Shizhen wrote in Bencao Gangmu that ejiao, originally made from beef skin, had become preferably from donkeys by his time. He described the prior beef gelatin as poorly made and only suitable as glue.

According to Dominique Parrenin, the product was traditionally prepared during the late fall and winter (from after the harvest and until the beginning of March). It was supposed to be made from the skin of a recently killed well-nourished black donkey. Since the supply of this material was rather limited, it was said that a large amount of "fake" ejiao was also manufactured, using skins from mules, horses, camels, pigs, and sometimes, it was said, even from old shoes; a bit of "real stuff" was added to it, to deceive consumers.

Ejiao is either prepared as dry gelatin or mixed with powdered oyster shell or pollen to form glue balls. It tastes sweet and slightly bitter.

Jesuits noted that while the "real" ejiao has no disagreeable taste or smell, the fake product could be distinguished by its unpleasant smell and taste, even when it was made from pig skins (which, supposedly, provided the best approximation of the real thing).

In the 21st century, ejiao manufacturers experience problems with the supply of genuine donkey hides, as fewer people raise these animals these days. The decreasing supply combined with strong demand for ejiao has led to greatly increased prices for donkey hides in China. This trend is also supported by restrictions on importing animal hides from outside the country. Qin Yufeng, the chairman of a major ejiao manufacturer and a member of Shandong's provincial legislature, has advocated for government support for donkey husbandry.

=== Donkey thefts and population declines ===
In the mid-2010s, donkey prices in many places around the world began to rise sharply with demand for ejiao. Uganda, Tanzania, Botswana, Niger, Burkina Faso, Mali, and Senegal have banned donkey exports to China. In November 2017, PETA Asia released eyewitness footage showing donkeys subject to poor conditions and treatment in farms. In November 2019, The Donkey Sanctuary reported that 4.8 million donkey hides were required to satisfy the global demand for ejiao, resulting in steep declines of donkey populations around the world. The demand for donkey hides was linked to the decline of donkey populations in the Northeast of Brazil, which led the Federal Court of Brazil to suspend the slaughter of donkeys for export to China.

According to the U.S. Congressional Research Service (CRS), between 2.3 million and 4.8 million donkeys are slaughtered annually for ejiao production, prompting fears that both legal and illegal donkey hide trade threatens donkey populations. For example, the donkey population in Botswana declined 70% between 2011 and 2021. In September 2021, Representative Don Beyer (D-VA-8) introduced House Resolution 5203, the Ejiao Act, which would prohibit the knowing sale or transport of ejiao (or products containing ejiao) in interstate or foreign commerce citing the decimation of donkey population and the availability of plant-based gelatins. The bill, introduced to the House Energy and Commerce Committee, was referred to the committee's Subcommittee on Health.

== Applications ==
In China ejiao is a traditional medicine used for different types of illnesses. An amount of 5 to 10 grams may be dissolved in hot water or wine and mixed with other ingredients in the traditional Chinese materia medica or taken alone. It is believed that donkey-hide gelatin treats a variety of conditions such as bleeding, dizziness, insomnia and a dry cough, despite a lack of evidence. It has however been found to have a hematopoietic effect, increasing the production of blood cells.

Quite a few manufacturers produce an ejiao bar called "gu yuan gao" (固元膏) in Shandong province. Gu yuan gao is made up of ejiao, nuts, sesame, Chinese dates and cooking wine. It can also be used as an edible coating for dates, producing another type of snack.

Ejiao is also used for applying di mo, a special paper-like musical reed membrane, to the dizi, a transverse Chinese flute; it dries quickly, holds quite firmly, and is water-soluble, allowing later replacement of di mo.

The basis for the hematopoietic effect of ejiao has been found to be at least in part a peptide resulting from the partial hydrolysis of collagen in the hide. The peptide as well as ejiao is orally active in anemic mice fed through gastric lavage, according to a 2016 Chinese study. The same study mentions that candidate peptides match the sequence of bovine collagen.
