= Errenzhuan =

Song and dance genre from Northeast China

Errenzhuan (simplified Chinese: 二人转; traditional Chinese: 二人轉; pinyin: Èrrénzhuàn, lit. "two-people rotation") is a genre of musical theater and folk dance from Northeast China, usually involving two performers (one male and one female). The dance uses folding fans or square-shaped red handkerchiefs, which are twirled as the songs are performed. It is popular due to its comedic dialogue and sketches, which have obfuscated the old dances and songs.

Errenzhuan was previously called a "double play". It may consist of half-class opera, small yangko, fengliu, Spring Song, double side songs, bouncing, or Northeastern local opera written by the people of Northeast China. This form of performance emerged at the beginning of the 21st century as a folk art of Northeast China. Errenzhuan means 'two people' (erren) 'telling stories through performing different roles' (zhuan).

Errenzhuan is one of the particular forms of Chinese walking-singing, which was famous in many northern Chinese provinces, such as Liaoning, Heilongjiang, Jilin, Inner Mongolia, and northeast Hebei. It is also referred to by the locals as the "Northeast-featured Errenzhuan", and has more than 300 years of history since its creation. Years of development have cultivated a variety of performances, divided into four factions: Eastern School, Western School, Southern School, and Northern School. Each faction has its own unique characteristics. At the end of the Qing Dynasty and the beginning of the Republic of China, the four major factions emerged separately from the countryside and spread to the rest of China.

Popular routines include "Fowling", "Selling Thread", "Reward for Detective Dee's Deeds", "Ancient City", "Blue Bridge Tryst", "Romance of the West Chamber", "At Ba Bridge", "Shuangsuo Mountain", "Huarong Pass", "Palace", "Baohao", "Panda", "Chanyu Temple", and "Spring Trip of Miss Yang the Eighth."

The performance of the duo is different from most Chinese dramas (such as those done by the Peking Opera). Errenzhuan is closely related to the common people (a "grassroots" style), and the content of the performance is closely related to the lives of the people in the northeastern region of the country. Errenzhuan started as a performance used by farmers during the off-season. As it became gradually accepted by the public, it developed into a professional form of entertainment.

== Development history ==
Errenzhuan originates in the three provinces of Northeast China: Liaoning, Jilin, and Heilongjiang. It is a form of quyi ("melodious art") storytelling by performers through singing and dancing. Bengbeng has been around for over 200 years. The script is written in language that is easy to understand by every day people, humorous, rich in local lifestyle, flavorful, and includes vocal music based on the northeastern folk songs. Errenzhuan formed in the Northeast is influenced by rural characteristics of the region's inhabitants, often including some inappropriate and bitter content. The main content of performances is generally very orthodox, such as "comment on the northeast drum", "comment on opera conten", or "lotus flower". Before the Jilin Folk Art Troupe (the former Jilin Provincial Opera Second Troupe) was established in 1980, the two performers used these kinds of performance.

After the establishment of the art troupe, it reorganized and regulated the content of the errenzhuan, and many areas became popular, in a type called errendou. Some of the better-known works include "Horse Before Water", "Roast Duck", "Eight Arches of Pigs", "Drunken Sky", "Monkey Wukong three-tone Banana Leaf Fan", "Blessing of Love Downhill", "Western View Painting", "Two Mothers", "Visit the sick", "Bao Gong Breaks the Empress Dowager", and "Blue Bridge.

The earliest record of the name Erren Zhuan comes from the Taidong Daily (published in Kangde, Manchuria) on April 27, 1934. According to the article, people are often invited to perform a duet in a teahouse in the city. These actors were called "lotuses" and they performed in various roles in different operas.

At the First National Folk Music and Dance Congress (held in Beijing in April 1953), errenzhuan was officially recognized in Chinese literary and art circles as the "signboard of the Northeast delegation".

== Modern errenzhuan ==
To increase popularity and attract audiences, some troupes began to use earthier humor and language. Zhao Benshan, a well-known comedian and performer in China, started a movement called Green Errenzhuan, which avoids controversial language and sexual innuendo. Some critics have suggested this is due to pressure from the Chinese government.

In 2004, a performance of He and She in Beijing had a traditional errenzhuan story (Widow Ma's Inn) as the first act and a French one-act play (Heart for Two, by French playwright Guy Foissy) as the second act.

== See also ==
- Errentai
- Dance of China
