= Xindi (instrument) =

The xindi (Chinese: 新笛; pinyin: xīndí; lit. 'new flute') is a Chinese musical instrument. A 20th-century derivative of the ancient dizi (bamboo transverse flute), the xindi is western influenced, fully chromatic, and usually lacks the dizi's distinctive di mo, or buzzing membrane.

The xindi is also known as the 11-hole di (十一孔笛). Its design is western influenced and based on the principal of equal temperament. It first appeared in the early 1930s. It was designed and produced by Ding Silin (丁西林1893-1974).

== Characteristics and range ==
The biggest difference between the xindi and the traditional Chinese di is that there are an additional five finger-holes compared to the six found on the di. Additionally, it has three more finger-holes than the Xiāo (簫) - an eight-hole flute which, itself, has extra finger-holes compared to the di, for the right little finger and left thumb. The additional finger-holes on the xindi are for the right-hand thumb, the little finger of the left hand, and the left index finger, which has to alternate between two finger-holes. The traditional flute exhibits imperfections during modulation due to difficulties in controlling the intonation of the semitone. Thus, the purpose of the additional holes is to help correct these imperfections. Through its 11-hole design, the xindi can play every semitone in the octave perfectly, and modulation is made easier and smoother due to its ability to be played in different keys. The player only needs to use their fingers to move down the holes to change key easily, whereas with the traditional Chinese flute the instrument itself must be changed. The biggest difference between the xindi and the traditional dizi is the xindi’s lack of a dimo (笛膜; 'di membrane'), which creates the characteristic timbre. This is why the xindi is unlike the qudi (曲笛) or bangdi (梆笛), which have a brighter and crisper timbre. Its tone is between that of a traditional Chinese flute and that of a Western concert flute, giving it a much mellower sound. Contrary to the two differences to the traditional dizi, the length and range of the xindi is similar to that of a G key Dà dí (大笛). Its range is also similar to the G range, which is common with the flute. The common range is from a lower tone D to a higher tone E, a total of 15 notes. Occasionally it can play in the treble range, however the sound is not desirable.

== Role of the xindi in music ==
In the modern day Chinese orchestra, the xindi plays an important role in the mid and lower tonal ranges, alongside other di instruments. It has the same function as the Cháng dí (长笛) in the Chinese Symphony Orchestra. The xindi features in more than half of all traditional Chinese ensemble music. Sometimes, the xindi is replaced by other instruments of similar range such as the dadi, xiao or changdi. This is due to its reduced popularity because of its complicated fingering and an insufficient range. Sometimes the qudi is used to simulate a xindi’s sound instead of a xindi itself; this is achieved by placing a plastic film over the Mó kǒng (膜孔). Although the xindi features significantly in ensemble performance, its use for solo performance is very rare. Due to its complicated fingering and limited range changes, it is often considered a slightly inferior performance instrument in comparison to the dadi or flute. It is mainly valued for its ability to play in semitones, which means it can be used for western style music more easily. However, it is not considered to be the optimal choice because the western flute has a broader range and a tone which complements the other orchestral instruments better. All these reasons contribute to why its use for solo performance is so restricted and rare.
