= Di mo =

Special membrane applied to the transverse Chinese flute dizi

The dimo (Chinese: 笛膜; pinyin: dímó; lit. 'di membrane') is a special membrane applied to the transverse Chinese flute called dizi (or di), giving the instrument its characteristic buzzing timbre.

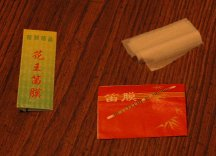
Di mo papers with packaging

Dimo, made from the tissue-thin membrane from the interior of a specific variety of bamboo, are supplied as tubular sleeves. Only a small rectangle is needed at a time, so for application, a small section is cut off the end of the di mo sleeve, and that small tube is cut open to make a rough rectangle of flat membrane.

The Korean transverse bamboo flute called daegeum has a similar buzzing membrane. The Korean sogeum and junggeum, Vietnamese sáo, and the Thai khlui also once had membranes, but these are not used today.

== Application ==
The di mo is applied to the membrane hole (or Mo kong) of the dizi using a special, traditional glue called Ejiao. One of the advantages of ejiao is that the glue is water-soluble, so that it can be wetted again to re-adjust the di mo.

After applying the glue around the mo kong, the di mo is applied, and then adjusted while the glue is still wet so that many creases form in a sequence along the length of the hole. Each crease should be parallel to the one before, crossing the hole horizontally, so that together they form a sort of pleat or corrugation.

If Ejiao is not available, a substitute can be improvised by simply crushing garlic into a fine, relatively dry paste, and applying as normal. It should be used quickly.

Although the purpose of applying di mo is simply to make the dizi operational, the application technique is considered to be an art in itself.
