= Mezber =

- Site location in Ethiopia
- 14°41′N 39°40′E
- Periods: Pre-Aksumite Period
- Location: Eastern Tigray, Ethiopia
- Region: Horn of Africa

Mezber is a Pre-Aksumite archaeological site located in eastern Tigrai, Ethiopia. Radiocarbon dating suggests that Mezber was occupied for approximately 1600 years (c. 1600 BCE - 25 CE), spanning the Initial, Early, Middle, and Late Pre-Aksumite phases and capturing a transition from agro-pastoralism to settled agriculturalism. The site was likely a rural agricultural village, with evidence for social stratification and elite households.

Unlike most Pre-Aksumite sites, Mezber was mostly undisturbed by later settlement in the region. Studying the Pre-Aksumite period is important for understandings of the rise of early state-level societies in Ethiopia, eventually leading to the rise of the Aksumite period. Research at Mezber at other sites in eastern Tigrai has suggested a mostly local origin for this cultural tradition, with influences from trade and exchange in the Red Sea and the presence South Arabian visitors.

Archaeological research at Mezber has produced the earliest known archaeological evidence for domestic chickens in the African continent, the earliest known agriculture and metal objects in the Horn of Africa, and the largest assemblage of Pre-Aksumite stone tools.

== Environment ==
The geology of the Tigray plateau was shaped by volcanic activity, resulting in a landscape with various plateaus and valleys ranging from 1,000 to 3,500 meters above sea level. Tigray is characterized by a semi-arid, subtropical climate, however, the variation in altitude resulted in the creation of microclimates in the Tigray plateau.

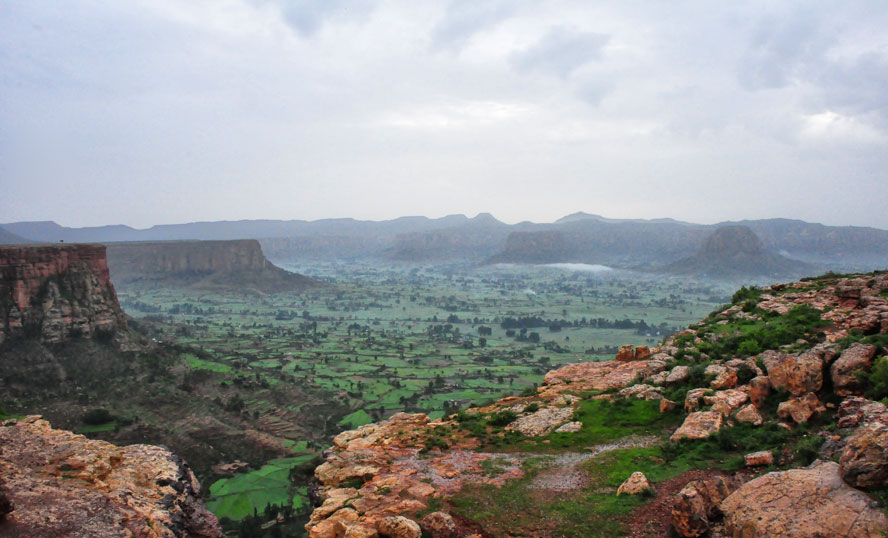
Tigray, Ethiopia

Mezber is located in the Gulo Makeda district in Eastern Tigray, Ethiopia, at 2,242 meters above sea level. The site is approximately 0.83 hectares large and is located at the bottom of a valley on a slightly raised hill near a stream. Settlement pattern analyses from the Pre-Aksumite Period have suggested that these agro-pastoralists and agriculturalists preferentially selected areas with more productive soil and available water. The environmental conditions and available plants and trees for the occupants at Mezber remained relatively stable, with no major changes in environment or climate during the Pre-Aksumite Period.

== Excavation history ==
Excavation Fields at Mezber

The Eastern Tigrai Archaeological Project (EATP) has been directed by C. D'Andrea since 2003. In 2005, ETAP identified Mezber during archaeological surveys in the Tigray region. From 2007-2012, ETAP excavated five units at the site (Fields A-E), some of which were then divided into areas (A1, A2, A3, etc.).

The research conducted by ETAP has primarily addressed the rise of social complexity in Eastern Tigrai, specifically examining the roles of internal and external cultural forces that impacted the development of Pre-Aksumite and Aksumite settlements.

== Site chronology ==
=== Initial Phase ===
The earliest occupation at Mezber dates to the Initial Phase (c. 1600-900 BCE). At this time, Mezber was likely occupied by semi-sedentary agro-pastoralists, as indicated by animal and plant remains dating to this time. The degree of sedentism during this phase has been hard to assess, as the absence of stone architecture suggests the agro-pastoralists at this site may have built temporary settlements or were more mobile than during later phases of occupation at the site.

=== Early Phase ===
Mezber was expanded during the Early Phase (c. 850-750 BCE), indicated by the construction of large buildings and walls. The increase in domestic architecture in Fields A, B, and C suggests increased sedentism during this time, while the presence of both wild and domestic grains and cereals indicates occupants at Mezber were agriculturalists. The diversity of objects at Mezber increases between the Initial and Early Phases, with an increase in varieties of copper-alloy objects. The construction large-scale stone architecture and evidence of increased craft specialization also suggests the presence of elite individuals or families at Mezber beginning in the Early Phase.

Despite the changes to diet and mobility between the Initial and Early Phases, there does not appear to be significant cultural change as reflected by continuity in material culture traditions. There does not appear to be a gap in occupation between the Initial and Early Phase, but there is a gap of approximately 250 years between the Early and Middle Phases.

=== Middle Phase ===
After the roughly 250-year gap between the Early Phase, occupation returns to Mezber during the Middle Phase (c. 500-400 BCE). Additional stone architecture was built on top of an ashy deposit covering the earlier architecture from the Initial Phase. At least three distinct construction events have been documented at Mezber during the Middle Phase, particularly in Fields A and E, with buildings extended further to the south of the site compared to earlier occupation phases. During the Middle Phase, the increase in architecture, livestock remains, plant remains, and specialized crafts was at its height.

=== Late Phase ===
The Late Phase (c. 400 BCE - 25 CE) of occupation at Mezber was continuous from the Middle Phase but saw a decrease in overall settlement size and diversity of livestock and plant products. The decrease in livestock remains from the Late Phase indicate an overall drop in agricultural intensification at Mezber during this time. Stone architecture from the Middle Phase was reused, particularly in Field A, with some new construction of food preparation areas in Field C. Occupants may have been producing food for household consumption, as suggested by the overall decrease in domestic architecture. Following the Late Phase at Mezber, the site was abandoned for unknown reasons.

=== Post-Occupational Phase ===
Two burials in the north of Field A date to after the main occupational phases at Mezber. These burials date to approximately 700-800 CE and are the last recorded archaeological activity at the site.

== Material culture ==
=== Stone Tools ===
At Mezber, over 33,000 stone artifacts were recorded from every occupation phase, making this the largest Pre-Aksumite assemblage of stone tools and one of the largest collection of stone tools in the Horn of Africa. The complex geography of the Tigray plateau is reflected in the variety of raw lithic materials used to make tools, such as basalt, obsidian, chert, quartz, and silicified siltstone. The stone objects at Mezber include scrapers, grinding stones, debitage, and hammerstones.

Over 5,000 stone scrapers were identified at Mezber. Scrapers from the site were selected for use-wear analysis which has suggested there was a hide working industry at Mezber, and most of the scrapers were used to process wet hides. Scrapers are typically used during the leather making process to scrape off the membrane from the hide. These scrapers have been primarily found in Field E, suggesting a specialized location of scraper production and use at the site. The scrapers appear during the Early Phase of site occupation, and the density of these tools increases during the Middle Phase, likely suggesting an increase in leather production.

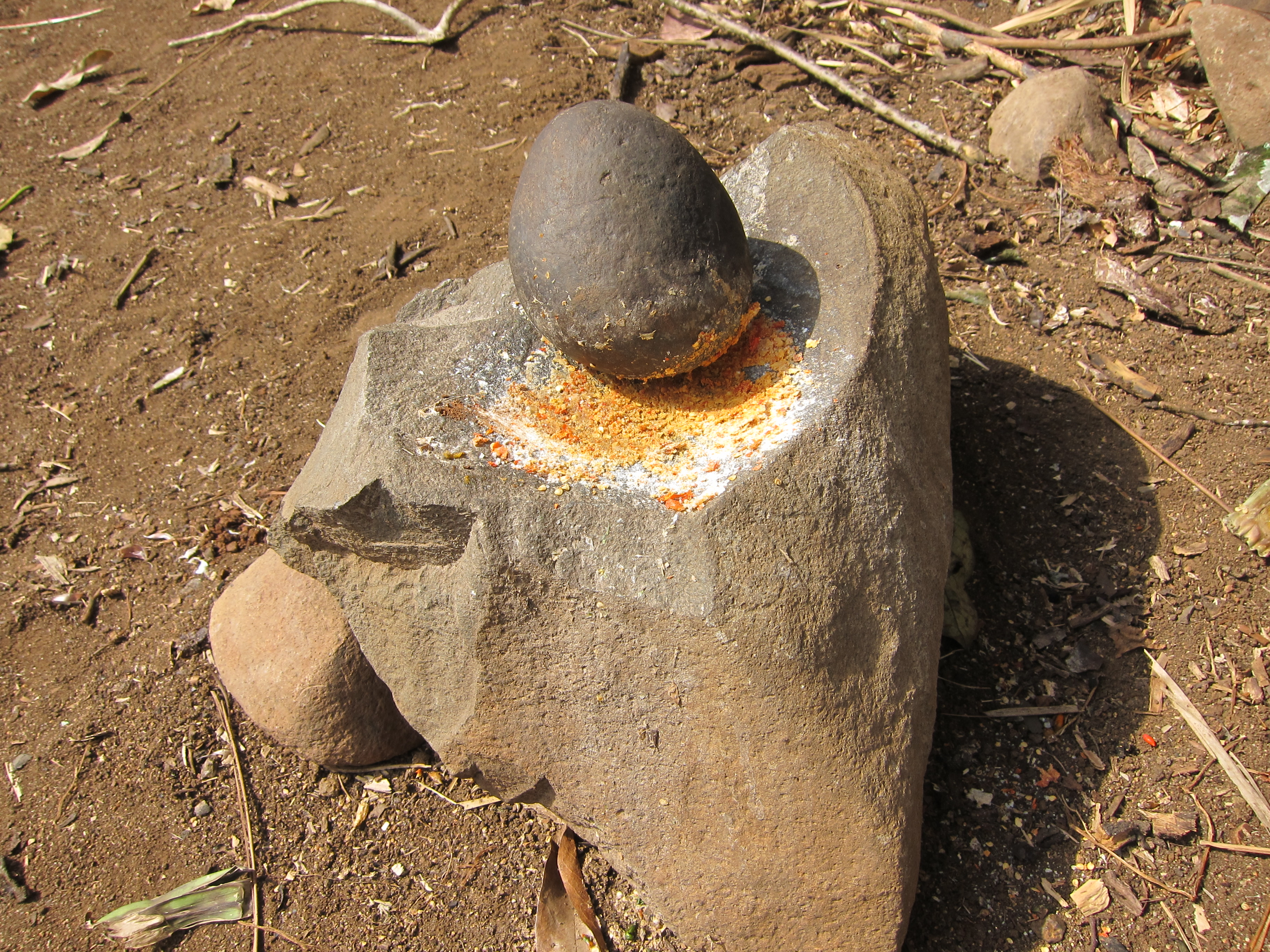
Grinding stones from SW Ethiopia

108 grinding stones were recorded at Mezber from every phase of occupation at the site. Ethnographic studies in the Gulo Makeda region recorded the continuous use of grinding stones in this region since the occupation of Mezber. In Field C1, a kitchen with a hearth dating to the Middle Phase had many large grinding stones, suggesting dedicated areas for food preparation. The size of grinding stones increased over phases of occupation at Mezber, likely reflecting increases in the demand for flour. Use-surface analysis and starch grains recovered from grinding stones suggests they were likely used to process both domestic and imported grains.

=== Ceramics ===
Ceramics at Mezber belong to the Agame Ceramic Tradition and were recovered from every occupation phase. While ceramic form was relatively continuous throughout occupation, gradual changes in ceramic form can be used to distinguish between phases. All pottery from Mezber was handmade using the coiling technique, and most of the ceramics at Mezber are grey or light brown and have micaceous inclusions. The most commonly occurring ceramic type at Mezber are large, open bowls often have notched rims and combed wavy line or zig-zag decorations on the internal surface. Red slip was used on several ceramic styles throughout site occupation, including cups, bowls, serving dishes, and bottles. White paste was also observed within incised decorations on various ceramic forms during the Early and Initial Phases. During the Middle Phase, ceramic forms and styles become more diverse, but similar styles from the Initial and Early Phases continue.

A variety of ceramic forms are present at the site. The ceramics primarily suggest they were used for food storage or preparation and for other everyday purposes in domestic contexts. Open bowls with carbonization suggest they were used as heating or cooking vessels over fire, and in some jars the internal surfaces were eroded, which may suggest they were used for fermentation. In Fields C1-C2, which have been identified as kitchen areas, open bowls, strainers, and polishers have been identified. Cooking and storage vessels, bowls, bottles, jars, cups, and dishes are found in other domestic contexts at the site. During the Early Phase, ceramics associated with domestic structures have assisted in the interpretation of wealthy or elite households.

=== Other Finds ===
Most small finds from Mezber include copper-alloy tools and personal adornments, beads, and ceramic figurines. Various small finds are present at every occupation phase, but the number and variety peaks during the Middle Phase and declines in the Late Phase. Several small finds from Mezber suggest connections to long-distance trade with the Red Sea.

A copper-alloy ring from Mezber dating to the Initial Phase is the earliest metal object identified in the Horn of Africa. The variety of copper-alloy objects increases during the Early Phase to include awls, pins, and blades and continues into the Middle Phase with tweezers, spirals, and rings. With no evidence for metalworking at Mezber, these copper objects were likely produced elsewhere.

Stone beads are present in all occupation phases. Flat, white chert beads were primarily made during the Initial and Early Phases. Spherical carnelian beads were used during the Middle Phase and tubular beads were used in the Late Phase. Shell beads made with Conus sp. also present during the Early Phase.

Ceramic personal adornments are identified beginning in the Early Phase. These include earspools, figurine fragments, and stamp seals. The stamp seals suggest the beginning of administrative power and exchange networks in the Early Phase that continues into and increases in the Middle Phase. A biconical insense burner dating to the Middle Phase was likely used for ritual purposes. Zoomorphic figurines were also identified in the Middle and Late Phases.

== Agricultural system ==
=== Livestock ===
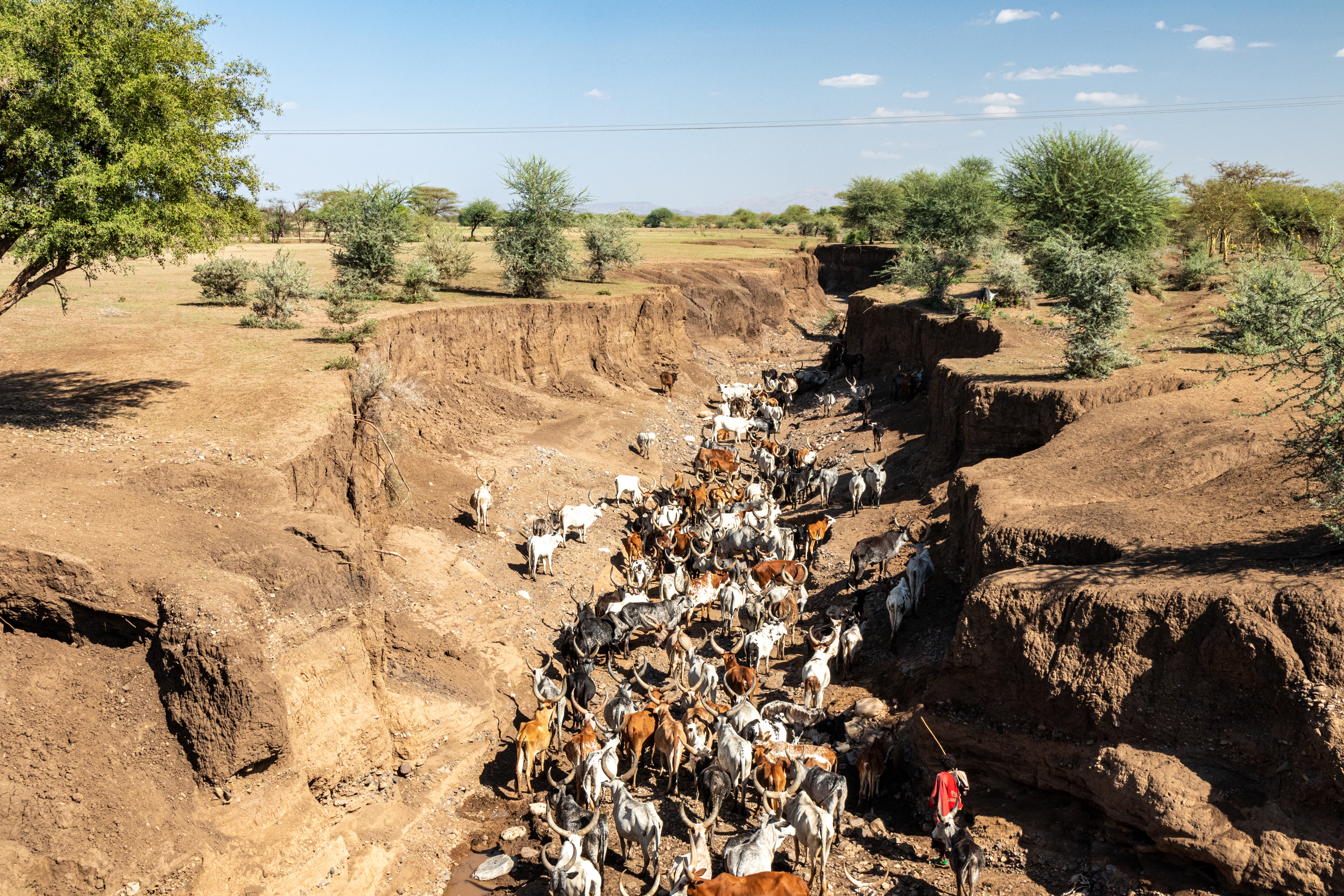
Livestock in Afar, Ethiopia

Zooarchaeological analysis from Mezber revealed that people who lived at the site used both domestic and non-domestic animal resources, however, the majority of animal remains from the site are from domestic livestock (i.e., cattle, sheep, goat, donkeys, chickens). Dogs and possible camel remains have also been documented at the site. The earliest evidence for donkeys in the Horn of Africa were found at Mezber.

Cattle accounted for 92% of livestock remains during the Initial Phase. During the Early Phase, the proportion of cattle decreases and the percentage of caprine (sheep and goat) remains increases. The increase in herd diversity in the Early Phase continues through the Late Phase, with cattle, sheep, and goats at represented in similar proportions.

The analysis of cattle remains suggests they may have been used for traction to pull ploughs during the Pre-Aksumite Period. The analysis of cut marks on animal remains revealed that the livestock were both raised and slaughtered at Mezber. Excavations at the site revelated that throughout site occupation, sections of Fields A1 and C2 were used to process domestic and non-domestic animal products, as well as areas of Fields A2, A3, and E1 during the Middle Phase.

==== Gallus gallus domesticus (Chicken) ====
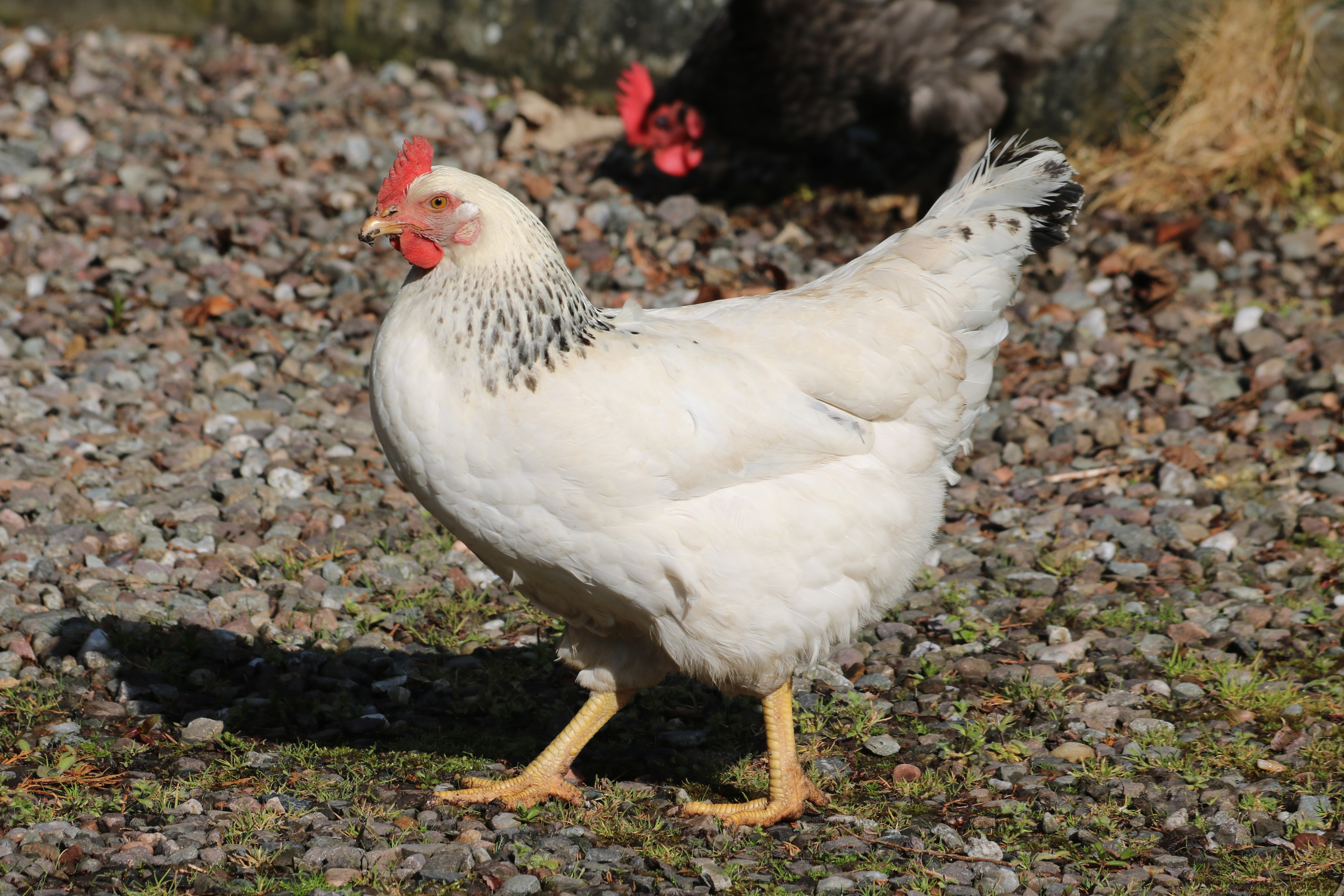
Domestic chicken

The presence of domestic chicken remains dating to the Early Phase represent the earliest dated evidence for these species in the African continent. This pre-dates the prior earliest known evidence of chickens in Egypt by at least 550 years. Chicken remains were primarily found in domestic contexts and had evidence of human bite marks and cut marks, suggesting they were incorporated into Pre-Aksumite diets, compared to their use in ritual contexts in Egypt. Comparing the bones of chicken from Mezber with those of modern chickens in the Tigray region also shows that the Mezber chickens were smaller. This difference in size may be the result of selective breeding.

The presence of chicken remains at Mezber supports other lines archaeological and linguistic data that have suggested trade with South Arabia may have been a route for the introduction of chickens to Africa. Trade routes from the Horn of Africa may have then been the source for the further spread of chickens throughout other regions of Africa.

=== Plants ===
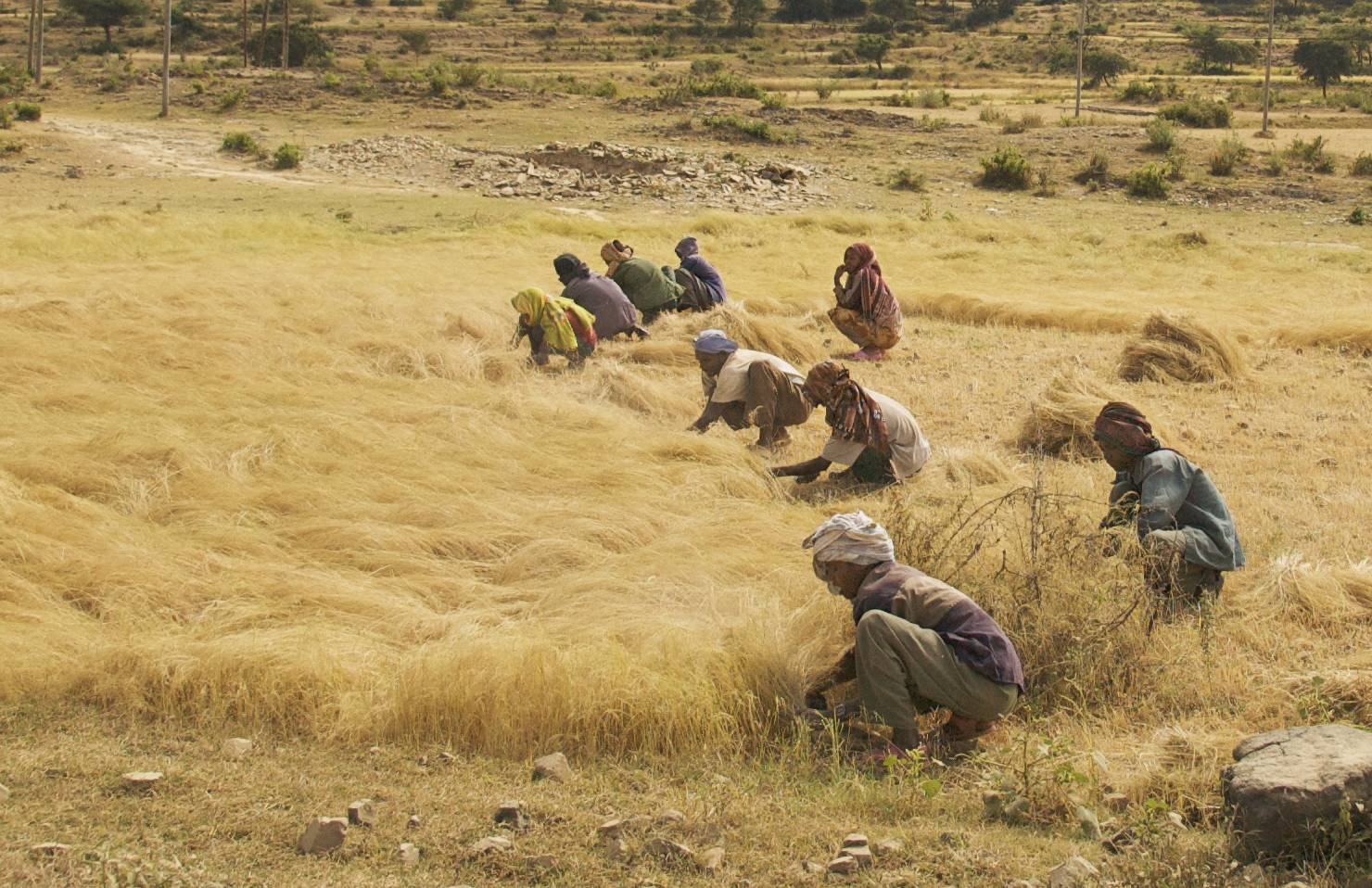
T'ef harvesting in Ethiopia, 2007

The earliest evidence for agriculture in the Horn of Africa has been documented at Mezber, with mixed agrarian economies practiced throughout occupation. An increase in sedentism in the Early Phase at Mezber may have resulted in a greater reliance on plant-based agriculture. During the Early Phase, plant production was occurring on a large scale, while the Middle and Late Phases were characterized by household production and processing of plants.

The variety of plant resources at Mezber remained relatively consistent throughout occupation with some minor differences between phases. Occupants at Mezber harvested and processed a combination of both indigenous and exogenous plants. Barley and linseed were recovered from all occupation phases, lentils were present from the Initial unitl the Middle Phase, and emmer was recorded only during the Early Phase. Starch grains and phytoliths from grinding stones also indicated the use of t'ef, finger millet, sorghum, Triticeae, Fabaceae, and wild grasses. T'ef is recorded in the Late Phase at Mezber dating to 400 BCE and was likely domesticated locally.
