= List of Chinese flutes =

Chinese musical instrument

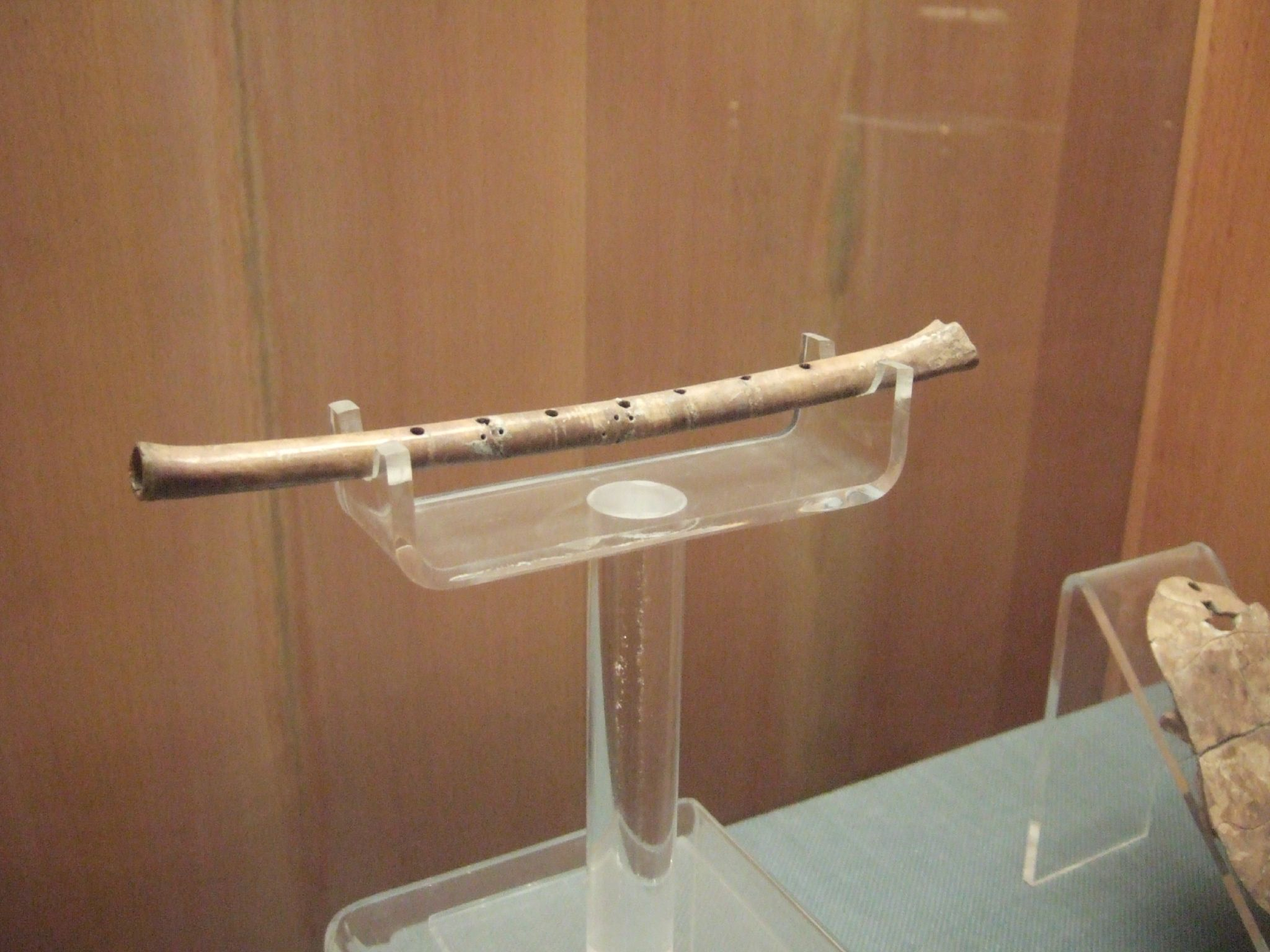
One of the gudi flutes discovered at Jiahu, on display at the Henan Museum.

Flutes made in China come in a variety of different types:

Transverse flutes:

- Dizi (and its varieties such as the qudi and bangdi; primary transverse flutes, usually made of bamboo and distinctively has a buzzing membrane)
- Koudi (a small center-blown mouth flute with open-ends)
- Tuliang (a large center-blown flute with open-ends)
- Chi (an ancient center-blown transverse flute with closed ends and front finger holes.)
- Hengxiao (dizi without membrane)
- Xindi (fully chromatic dizi without membrane)
- Jiajian Di (keyed dizi without membrane)

End-blown flute:

- Xiao (end-blown vertical bamboo flute)
- Gudi, an ancient vertical flute made from the bones of large birds
- Paixiao (pan pipes with distinctive notched or curved blowholes to allow for greater expression)
- Xun (clay globular flute)

(Uyghur and Mongolian minorities also play a version of the Turkish ney.)

Fipple flutes:

- Jiexiao "Sister xiao" (one of many forms of recorder-style flutes)
- Dongdi (special recorder-style flute with additional internal reed)
- Paidi (fipple pipes)
- Taodi and Wudu (Chinese ocarina.)

Free reed flutes:

- Bawu (transverse free-reed flute)
- Hulusi (vertical gourd free-reed flute normally with one or two drone pipes)
- Miaodi (raj nplaim): transverse free-reed flute of Hmong people

Chinese flutes are generally made from bamboo (see bamboo flute) and belong to the bamboo classification of Chinese music, although they can be (and have been) made of other materials such as jade.
