= Paidi (instrument) =

Woodwind instrument
- Hornbostel–Sachs classification: 421.122.1 (Sets of open side-blown flutes)
- Inventor(s): Zhao Songting
- Developed: 1960s

Related instruments
- dizi; paixiao

Musicians
- Zhao Songting; Dai Ya; Du Rusong; Jiang Guoji

Paidi (Chinese: 排笛) is an instrument that consists of two to four parallel dizis of different length bound together. It was invented by Zhao Songting at the beginning of 1960s. Compared with the conventional dizi, paidi has a wider range and can produce different timbres.
