= Dizi (instrument) =

Chinese transverse flute

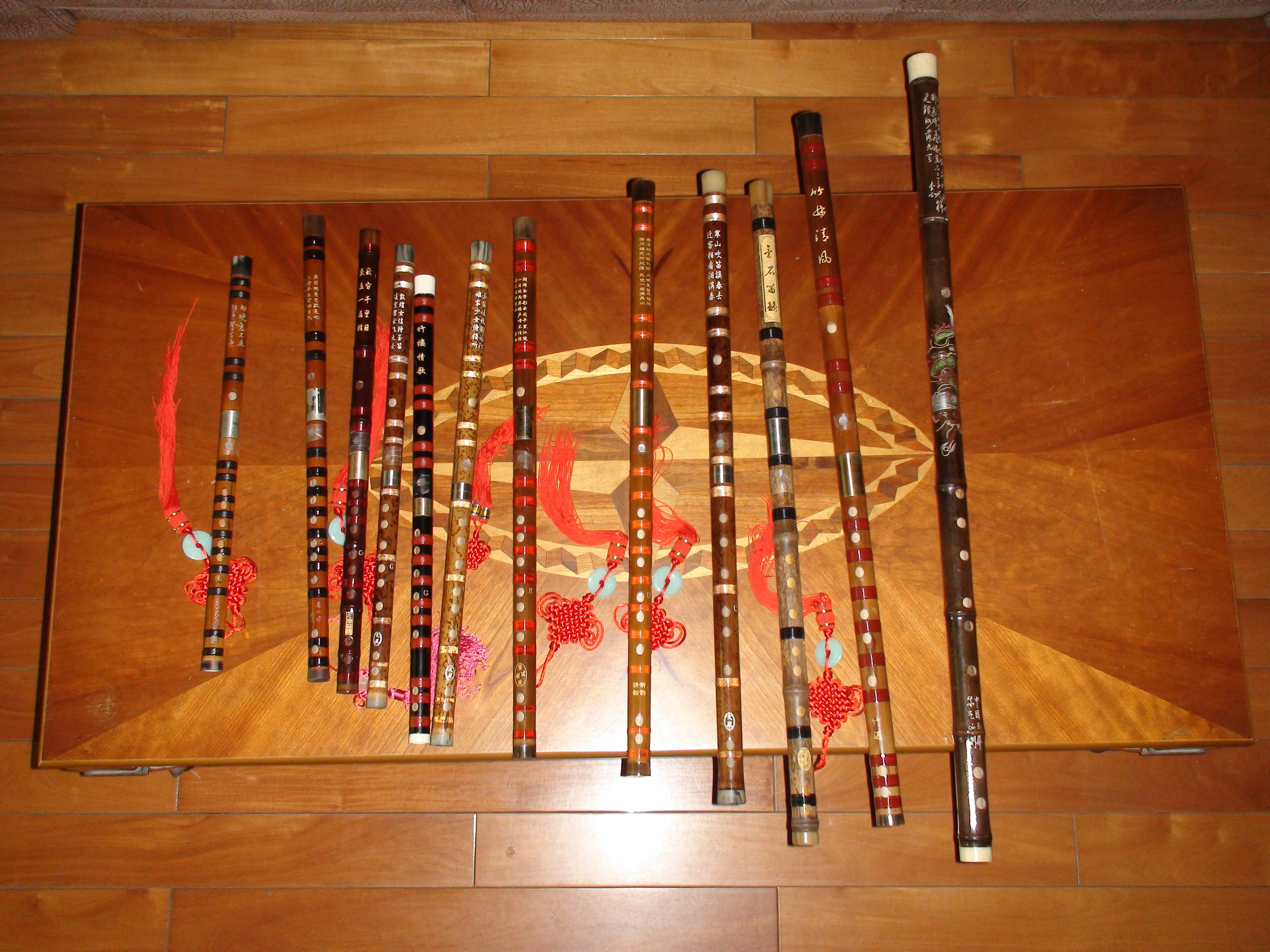

Woodwind instrument
- Hornbostel–Sachs classification: 421.121.12 (Open side-blown flutes with fingerholes)

Related instruments
- Alto flute; bansuri; bass flute; contra-alto flute; contrabass flute; chi; dangjeok; daegeum; danso; diple; double contrabass flute; fife; hotchiku; hun; hyperbass flute; Irish flute; junggeum; kaval; kagurabue; komabue; minteki; ney; nohkan; ocarina; palendag; piccolo; pipe and tabor; quena; recorder; sáo; shakuhachi; shinobue; subcontrabass flute; suling; tin whistle; treble flute; tumpong; tungso; venu; washint; western concert flute; xiao; xun; yak

Sound sample
- file; help

The dizi (Chinese: 笛子; pinyin: dízi, pronounced [tǐt͡sɨ]) is a Chinese transverse flute. It is also sometimes known as the di (笛) or héngdi (橫笛), and has varieties including Qudi (曲笛), Bangdi (梆笛), and Xindi (新笛). It is a major Chinese musical instrument that is widely used in many genres of Chinese folk music, Chinese opera, as well as the modern Chinese orchestra. The dizi is also a popular instrument among the Chinese people as it is simple to make and easy to carry. (Note: This is in contrast to the xiao, a vertical bamboo flute which has historically been favored by scholars and the upper classes.)

Most dizi are made of bamboo, which explains why dizi are sometimes known by simple names such as Chinese bamboo flute. However, "bamboo" is perhaps more of a Chinese instrument classification like "woodwind" in the West. Northern Chinese dizi are made from purple or violet bamboo, while dizi made in Suzhou and Hangzhou are made from white bamboo. Dizi produced in southern Chinese regions such as Chaozhou are often made of very slender, lightweight, light-colored bamboo and are much quieter in tone.

Although bamboo is the common material for the dizi, it is also possible to find dizi made from other kinds of wood, or even from stone. Jade dizi (or 玉笛; yùdi) are popular among both collectors interested in their beauty, and among professional players who seek an instrument with looks to match the quality of their renditions; however, jade may not be the best material for dizi since, as with metal, jade may not be as tonally responsive as bamboo, which is more resonant.

The dizi is not the only bamboo flute of China. Other Chinese bamboo wind instruments include the vertical end-blown xiao and the koudi.

== History ==
Archaeologists have discovered evidence suggesting that the simple transverse flutes (though without the distinctive mokong of the dizi) have been present in China for over 9,000 years. Fragments of bone flutes from this period are still playable today, and are remarkably similar to modern versions in terms of hole placement, etc. The Jiahu neolithic site in central Henan province of China has yielded flutes dating back to 7,000 BC – 5,000 BC that could represent the earliest playable instruments ever found. These flutes were carved with five to eight holes, and are capable of producing sounds that roughly span an octave. The dizi as we know it today roughly dates to the 5th century BC, and there have been examples of bamboo dizi that date back to the 2nd century BC.

These flutes share common features with other simple flutes from cultures all around the world. Multiple examples from different cultures consist of a drilled piece of bone, which is well-suited as a material due to its hollow nature. The earliest known examples of bone flutes date back around 42,000 years ago.

=== Modern modifications ===
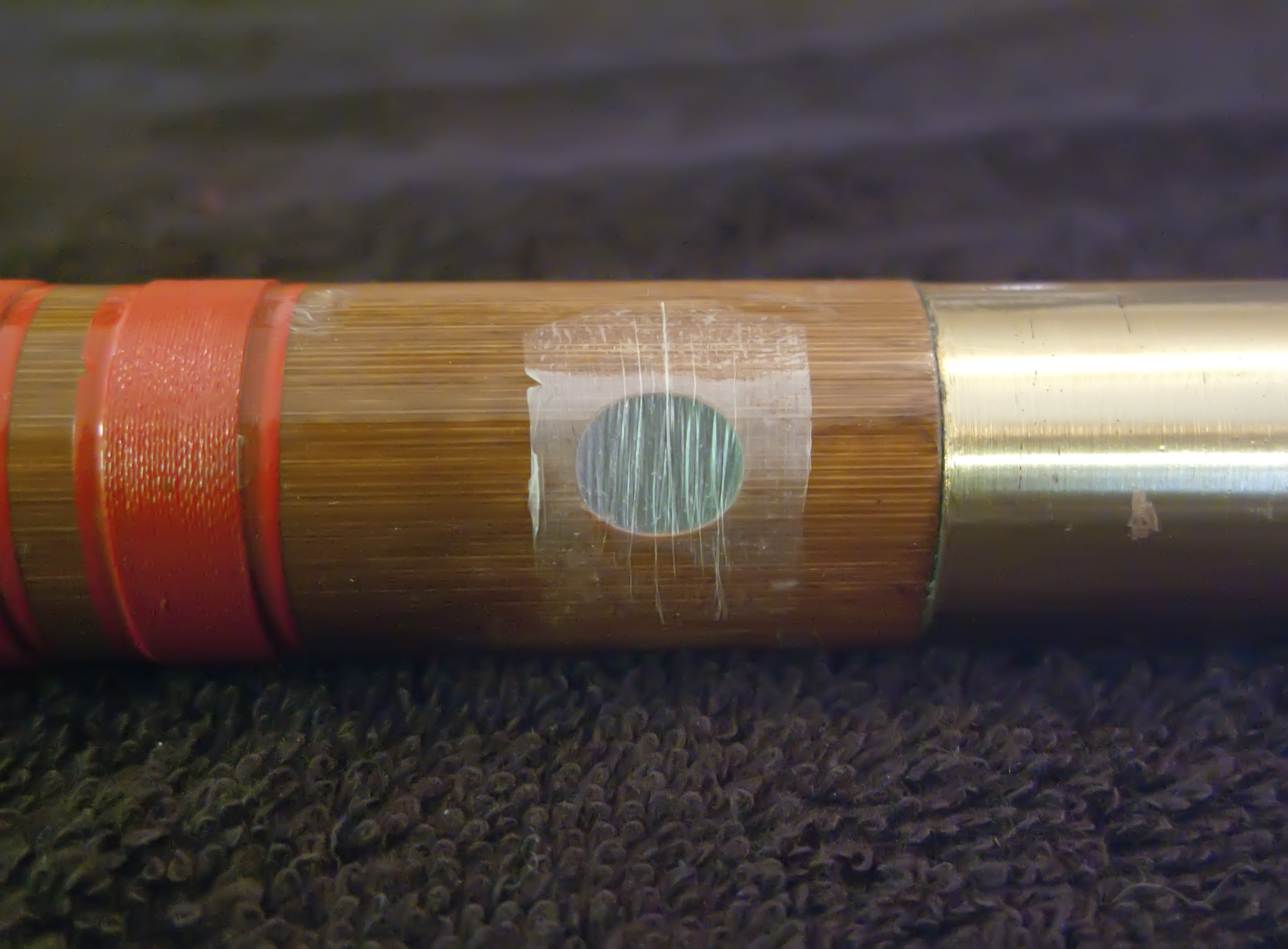
Close-up of the di mo on a dizi, as well as the metal joint of a dizi.

Traditionally dizi is made by using a single piece of bamboo. While simple and straightforward, it is also impossible to change the fundamental tuning once the bamboo is cut, which made it a problem when it was played with other instruments in a modern Chinese orchestra. In the 1920s musician Zheng Jinwen (鄭覲文, 1872–1935) resolved this issue by inserting a copper joint to connect two pieces of shorter bamboo. This method allows the length of the bamboo to be modified for minute adjustment to its fundamental pitch.

On traditional dizi the finger-holes are spaced approximately equidistant, which produces a temperament of mixed whole-tone and three-quarter-tone intervals. Zheng also repositioned the figure-holes to change the notes produced. During the middle of the 20th century dizi makers further changed the finger hole placements to allow for playing in equal temperament, as demanded by new musical developments and compositions, although the traditional dizi continue to be used for purposes such as kunqu accompaniment.

In the 1930s, an 11-hole, fully chromatic version of the dizi was created called the xindi (新笛), pitched in the same range as the western flute. However, the modified dizi's extra tone holes prevent the effective use of the membrane, so this instrument lacks the inherent timbre of the traditional dizi family.

While the bangdi (pitched in the same range as western piccolo) and qudi (pitched a fourth or fifth lower than the bangdi) are the most prevalent, other dizi include the xiaodi/gaoyindi (pitched a fourth or fifth higher than the bangdi), the dadi/diyindi (pitched a fourth or fifth lower than qudi), and the deidi/diyindadi (pitched an octave lower than qudi.)

== Membrane ==
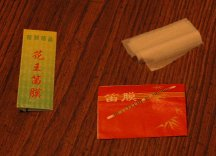
Dizi bamboo membrane, or dimo

Whereas most simple flutes have only a blowing hole (known as chui kong (吹孔) in Chinese) and finger-holes, the dizi has a very different additional hole, called a mo kong (膜孔), between the embouchure and finger-holes. A special membrane called dimo (笛膜, lit. "di membrane"), made from an almost tissue-like shaving of reed (made from the inner skin of bamboo cells), is made taut and glued over this hole, traditionally with a substance called ejiao, an animal glue. Garlic juice may also be used to adhere the dimo, but it is not recommended as a permanent replacement. This application process, in which fine wrinkles are created in the centre of the dimo to create a penetrating buzzy timbre, is an art form in itself.

The dimo-covered mo kong has a distinctive resonating effect on the sound produced by the dizi, making it brighter and louder, and adding harmonics to give the final tone a buzzing, nasal quality. Dizi have a relatively large range, covering about two-and-a-quarter octaves.

For beginners, tape can be used in place of dimo to cover the mo kong during practice, although most professionals use dimo, especially when performing.

== Playing styles and techniques ==
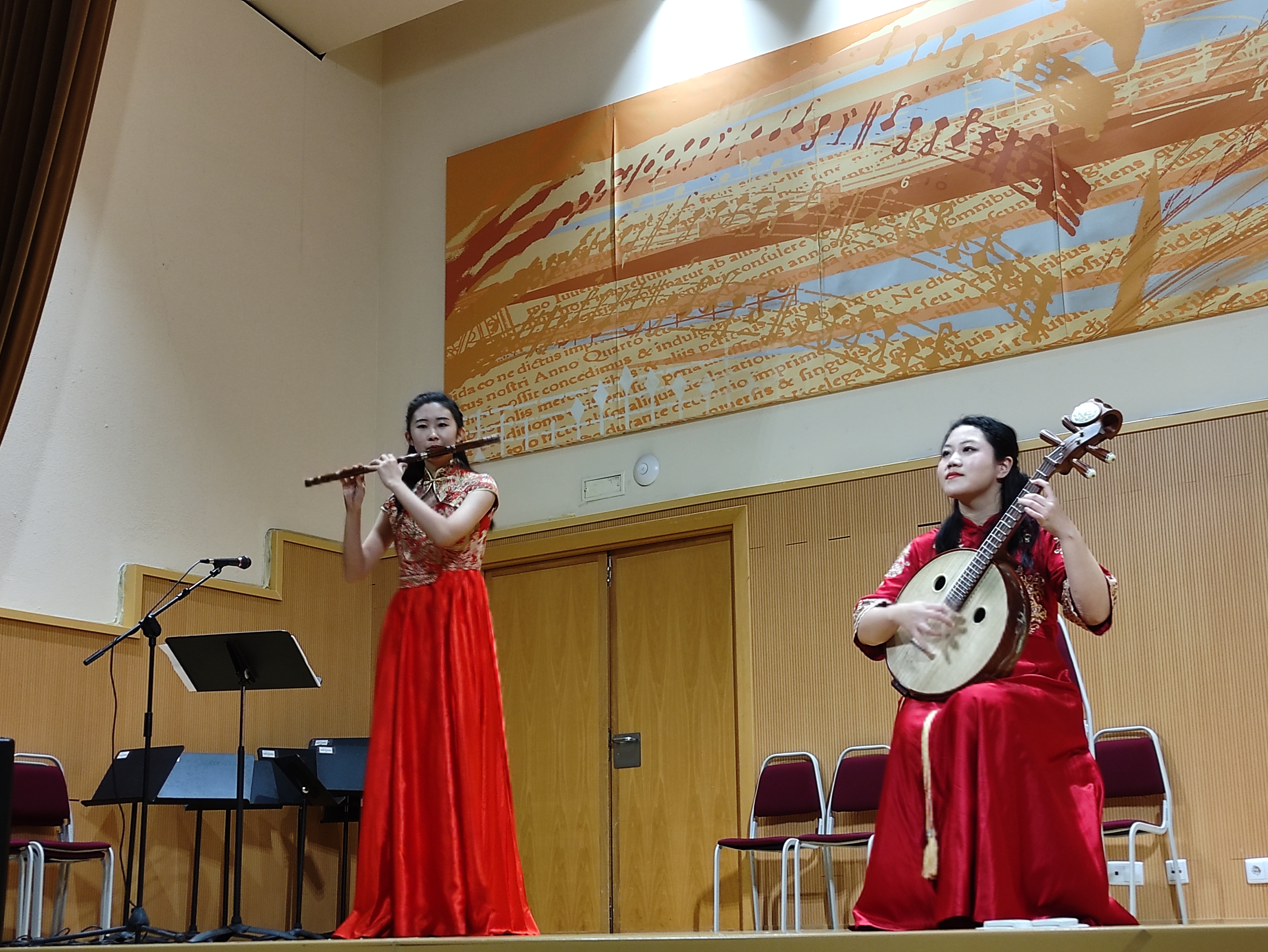
A Zhudi and a Zhongruan interpreter, from the NENU Folklorical Orchestra.

Contemporary 'dizi' styles or schools based on the professional conservatory repertory are divided into two: Northern and Southern, each style having different preferences in dizi and playing techniques, with different methods for embellishment and ornamentation of the melody.

- Northern school (Beipai) – The dizi used for the Northern school, the bangdi, is shorter and higher in pitch, and its sound quality is brighter and more shrill. In Northern China, it is used in kunqu and bangzi opera, and as well as regional musical genres such as errentai. Dizi music of the Northern school is characterized by a fast, rhythmic and virtuosic playing, employing techniques such as glissando, tremolo, flutter tonguing, and fast tonguing.
- Southern school (Nanpai) – In Southern China, the qudi is the lead melodic instrument of kunqu opera and is also used in music such as Jiangnan sizhu. It is longer, and has a more mellow, lyrical tone. The music of the Southern school is usually slower, and the ornamentations are predominantly short melodic turns, trills, and appoggiatura or grace note.

Dizi are often played using various "advanced" techniques, such as circular breathing, slides, popped notes, harmonics, "flying finger" trills, multiphonics, fluttertonguing, and double-tonguing, which are also common in similar instruments, such as the western concert flute and recorder. Most professional players have a set of seven dizi, each in a different key (and size). Additionally, master players and those seeking distinctive sounds such as birdsong may use extremely small or very large dizi.

== Performers ==
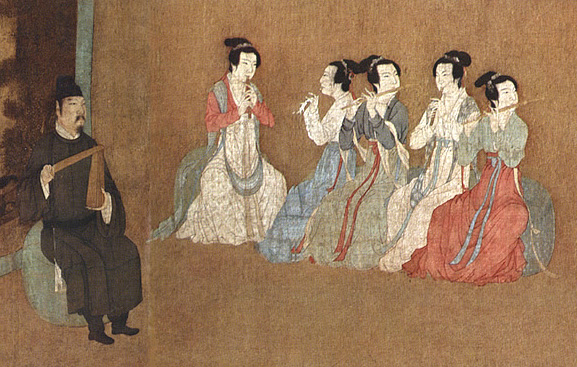
Detail of the 12th-century Song dynasty painting Night Revels of Han Xizai depicting two dizi players, with three guan (ancient oboe-like instrument) players and one paiban (wooden clapper)

There have been several major performers of the 20th century who have contributed to dizi playing in the new conservatory professional concert repertory, often based on or adapted from regional folk styles. Following the Chinese Communist Revolution, and according to the Yan'an forum talks, the instrument was appreciated for its popular roots, and used extensively in revolutionary music.

Feng Zicun (冯子存, 1904–1987) was born in Yangyuan, Hebei province. Of humble origins, Feng had established himself as a folk musician by the time of the founding of the People’s Republic of China, playing the dizi as well as the four-string fiddle sihu in local song and dance groups, folksongs and stilt dances. He also introduced Errentai, the local opera of Inner Mongolia, to Hebei after spending four years there as a musician in the 1920s.

In 1953, Feng was appointed to the state-supported Central Song and Dance Ensemble in Beijing as dizi soloist, and accepted a teaching post at the China Conservatory of Music (Beijing) in 1964.

Feng adapted traditional folk ensemble pieces into dizi solos, such as Xi xiang feng (Happy Reunion), Wu bangzi (Five Clappers), contributing to the new Chinese conservatory curricula in traditional instrument performance. Feng’s style, virtuosic and lively, has been known as representative of the folk musical traditions of northern China.

Liu Guanyue (刘管乐, 1918–1990) was born in An'guo county, Hebei. Born to a poor peasant family, Liu was a professional folk musician who had earned a meagre living playing the guanzi, suona, and dizi in rural ritual ensembles before becoming a soloist in the Tianjin Song-and-Dance Ensemble (Tianjin gewutuan) in 1952.

Liu together with Feng Zicun are said to be representatives of the Northern dizi style. His pieces, including Yin zhong niao (Birds in the Shade), He ping ge (Doves of Peace) and Gu xiang (Old Home village) have become part of the new conservatory professional concert repertory.

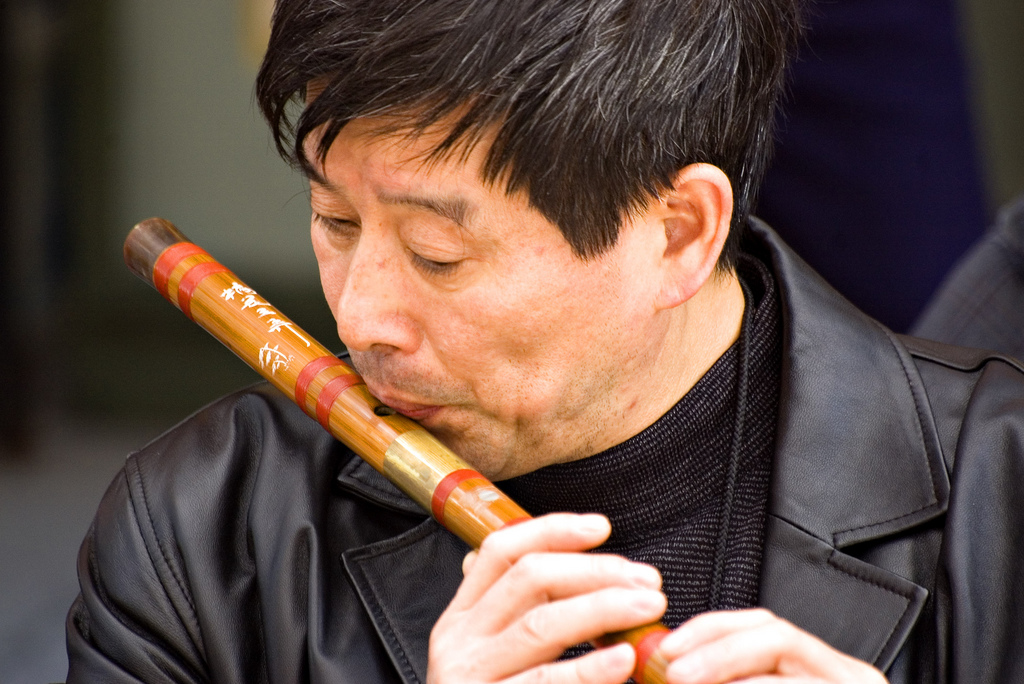
A Dizi player

Lu Chunling (陆春龄, 1921–2018) was born in Shanghai. In pre-1949 Shanghai, Lu worked a trishaw driver, but was also an amateur musician, performing the Jiangnan sizhu folk ensemble repertory. In 1952, Lu became dizi soloist with the Shanghai Folk Ensemble (Shanghai minzu yuetuan), and also at the Shanghai Opera Company (Shanghai geju yuan) from 1971 to 1976. In 1957 he taught at the Shanghai Conservatory of Music, and became associate professor in 1978.

Lu has performed in many countries as well as throughout China and has made many recordings. His dizi playing style has become representative of the Jiangnan dizi tradition in general. He is well known as a longtime member of the famous Jiangnan sizhu music performance quartet consisting of Lu Chunling, Zhou Hao, Zhou Hui, and Ma Shenglong. His compositions include Jinxi (Today and Yesterday).

Zhao Songting (赵松庭, 1924–2001) was born in Dongyang county, Zhejiang. Zhao trained as a teacher in Zhejiang, and studied law and Chinese and Western music in Shanghai. In the 1940s he worked as a music teacher in Zhejiang, and became the dizi soloist in the Zhejiang Song and Dance Ensemble (Zhejiang Sheng Gewutuan) in 1956. He also taught at the Shanghai Conservatory of Music and the Zhejiang College of Arts (Zhejiang Sheng Yishu Xuexiao).

Because of his middle-class background, Zhao suffered in the political campaigns of the 1950s and 1960s and was not allowed to perform, instead he taught many students who went on to become leading professional dizi players, and to refine dizi design. He was reinstated in his former positions in 1976.

Zhao's compositions include San Wu Qi (Three-Five-Seven), which is based on a melody from Wuju (Zhejiang traditional opera).

Yu Xunfa (俞逊发, 1946–2006) was a prominent dizi soloist and composer from Shanghai. He performed with the Shanghai National Orchestra and served as head of the Chinese Dizi Culture Research Centre of Shanghai. The State Council of the People's Republic of China gave him a Life Achievement Award as well as a Lifelong Special Allowance from the State. He is also known for having invented the koudi in 1971.

Ma Di (馬迪) is a current composer and soloist known for his technique on the instrument.

Tang Junqiao (唐俊乔) is a practitioner with international performances alongside Shanghai Symphony Orchestra, New York Philharmonic, and London Symphony Orchestra, as well as in movie Crouching Tiger, Hidden Dragon.

== Use in other music genres ==
Ron Korb (龍笛 (音樂家) or phonetically translated to "雷恩寇伯"), born in Toronto, Canada, is the first renowned western musician playing dizi along with numerous other world woodwinds. He graduated from the Faculty of Music at the University of Toronto with an honors degree in performance. On many of his recordings, he uses the dizi as the lead instrument. He has also used dizi in the film soundtracks of The White Countess, Relic Hunter, China Rises, and Long Life, Happiness, & Prosperity.

== See also ==
- Chinese flutes
- Traditional Chinese musical instruments
- Koudi
- Music of China
