= Danso =

Traditional Korean bamboo flute

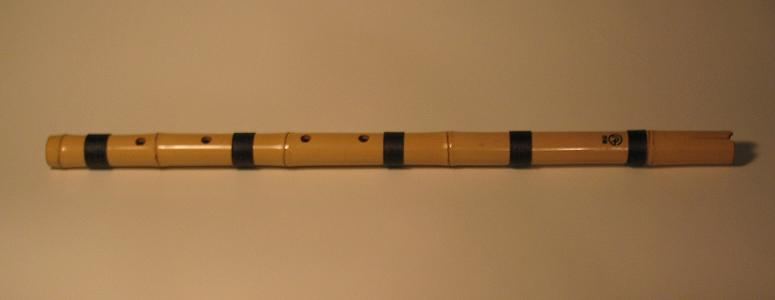
- Common modern danso, made of varnished bamboo

Korean name
- Hangul: 단소
- Hanja: 短簫
- RR: danso
- MR: tanso

Danso fingering chart (all pitches sound one octave higher than written)

The danso (also spelled tanso) is a Korean notched, end-blown vertical bamboo flute used in Korean folk music. It is traditionally made of bamboo, but since the 20th century it has also been made of plastic. It was imported from China in the 19th century, where it is called duanxiao (simplified Chinese: 短箫; traditional Chinese: 短簫; pinyin: duǎnxiāo; lit. 'short xiao'). The Korean name is the transliteration of the Chinese one, a short variant of the xiao.

The flute has four finger holes and one thumb hole at the back. The playing range is two octaves, going from low G to high G. The lower sounds are made by just blowing, whereas the higher ones are made by difference in the strength of the blowing. The tone is clear, and it is also used as a solo instrument, but is mainly used for ensemble with other instruments in chamber music.

The dan in the instrument's name means "short", and so refers to the notched, end-blown vertical bamboo flute. To match its name, It is the shortest wind instrument played vertically. Another Korean end-blown vertical bamboo flute, the tungso, is longer.

== Gallery ==
Types of Danso

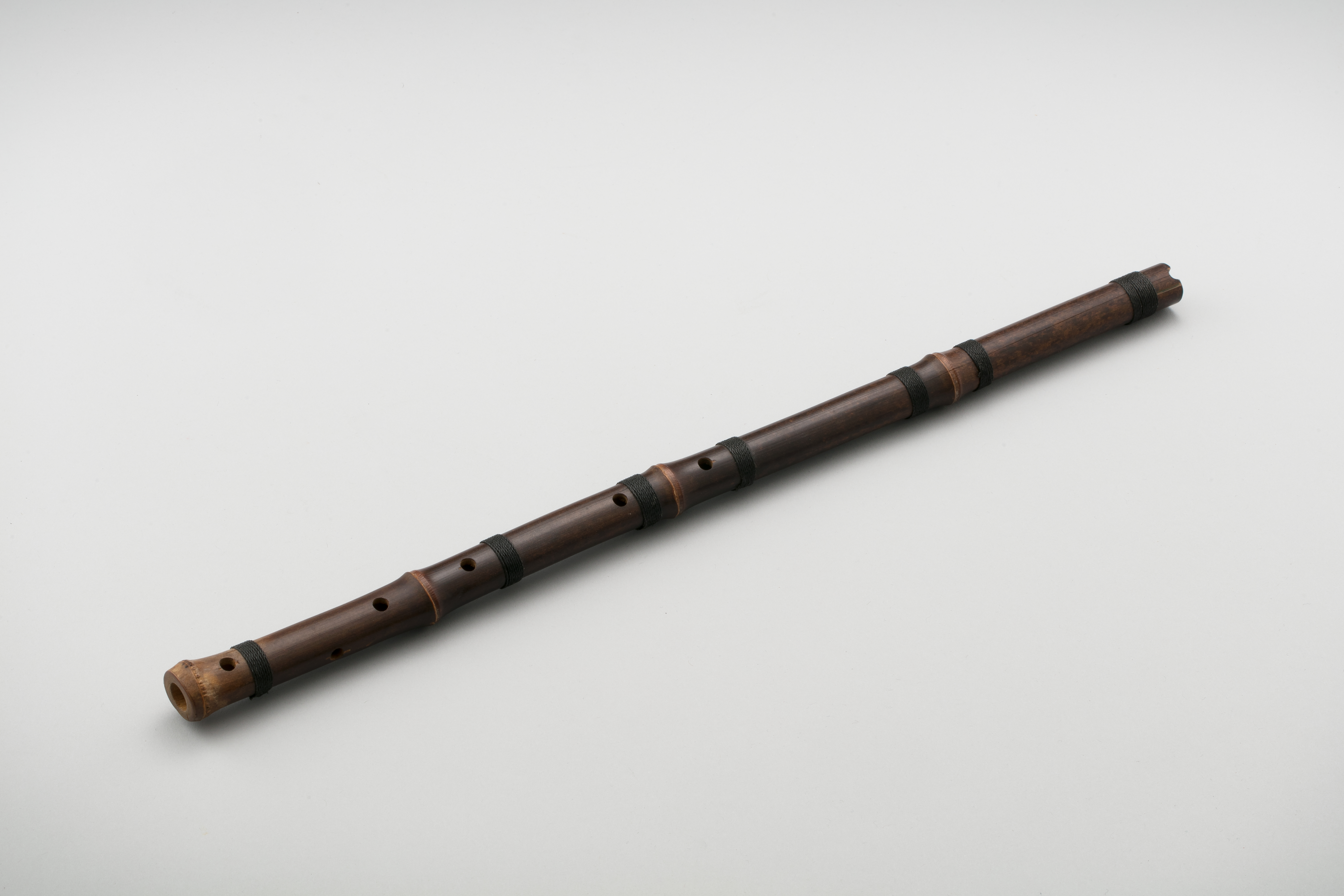
Ojuk danso (Black bamboo danso)

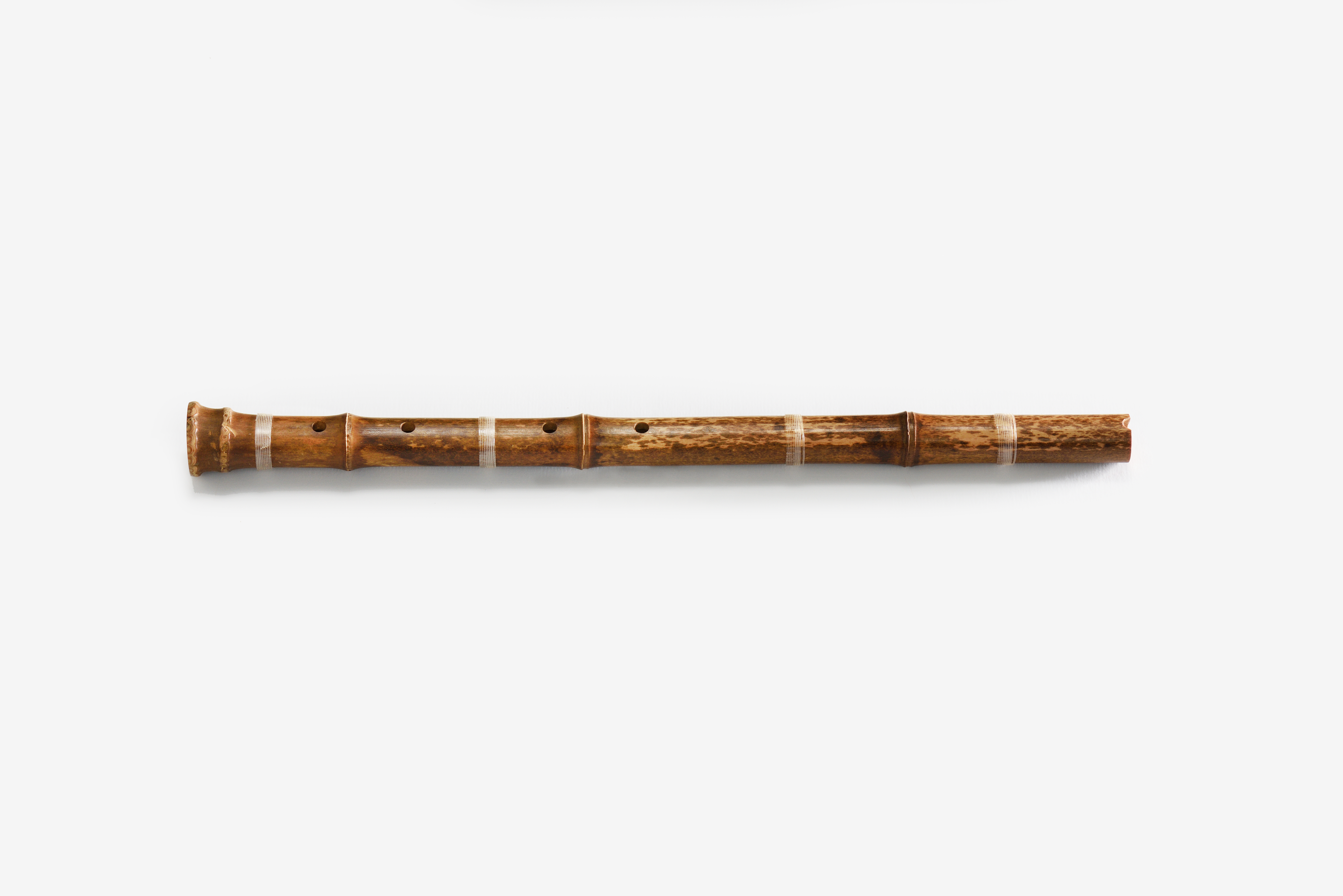
Traditional danso

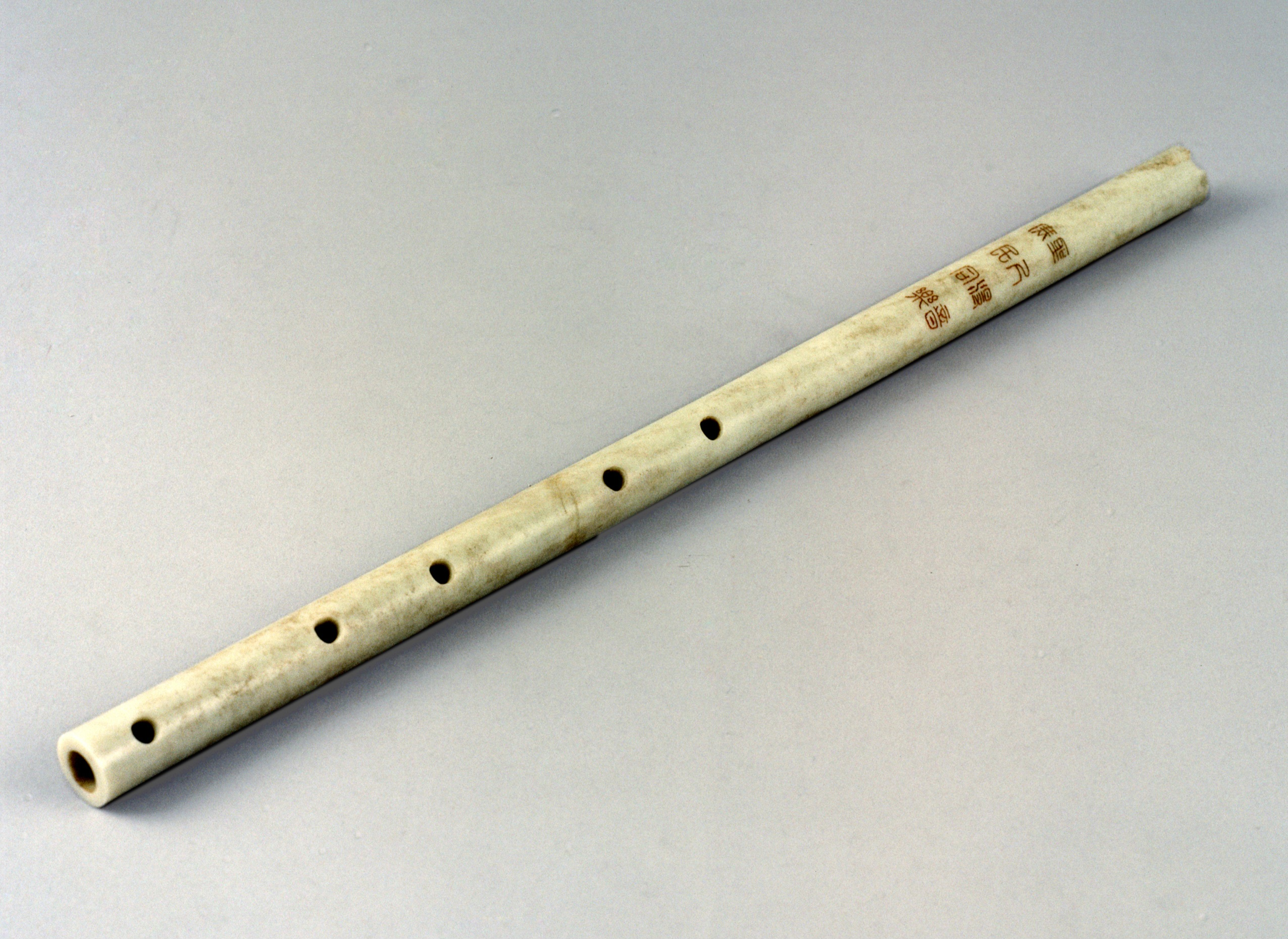
Okdanso (Jade danso)

== See also ==
- Bamboo musical instruments
- Traditional music of Korea
- Quena
- Traditional Korean musical instruments
- Tungso
- Xiao (flute)
