= Tungso =

Korean bamboo flute

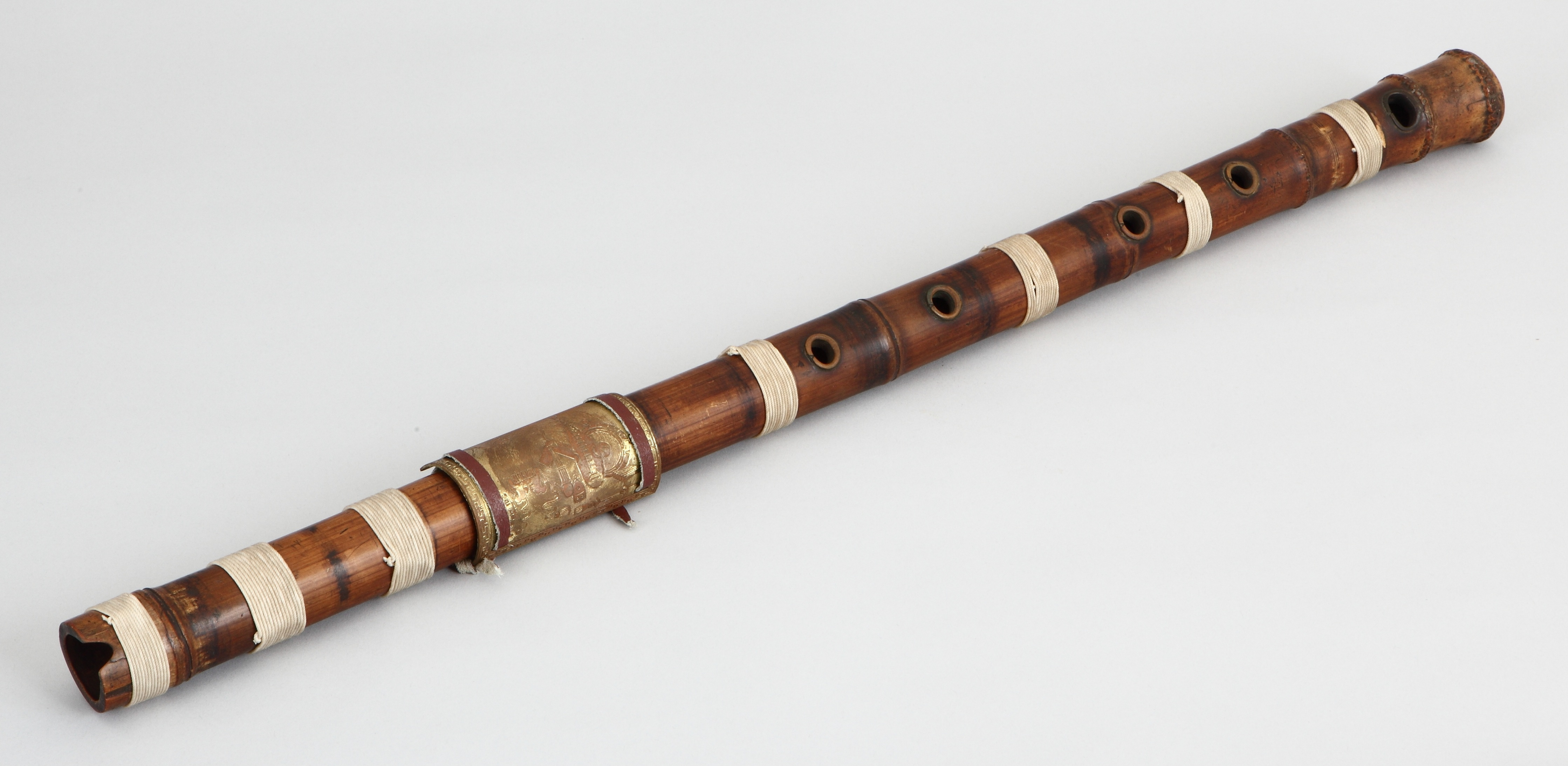

Korean name
- Hangul: 퉁소
- Hanja: 洞簫
- Revised Romanization: tungso, tongso
- McCune–Reischauer: t'ungso, t'ongso

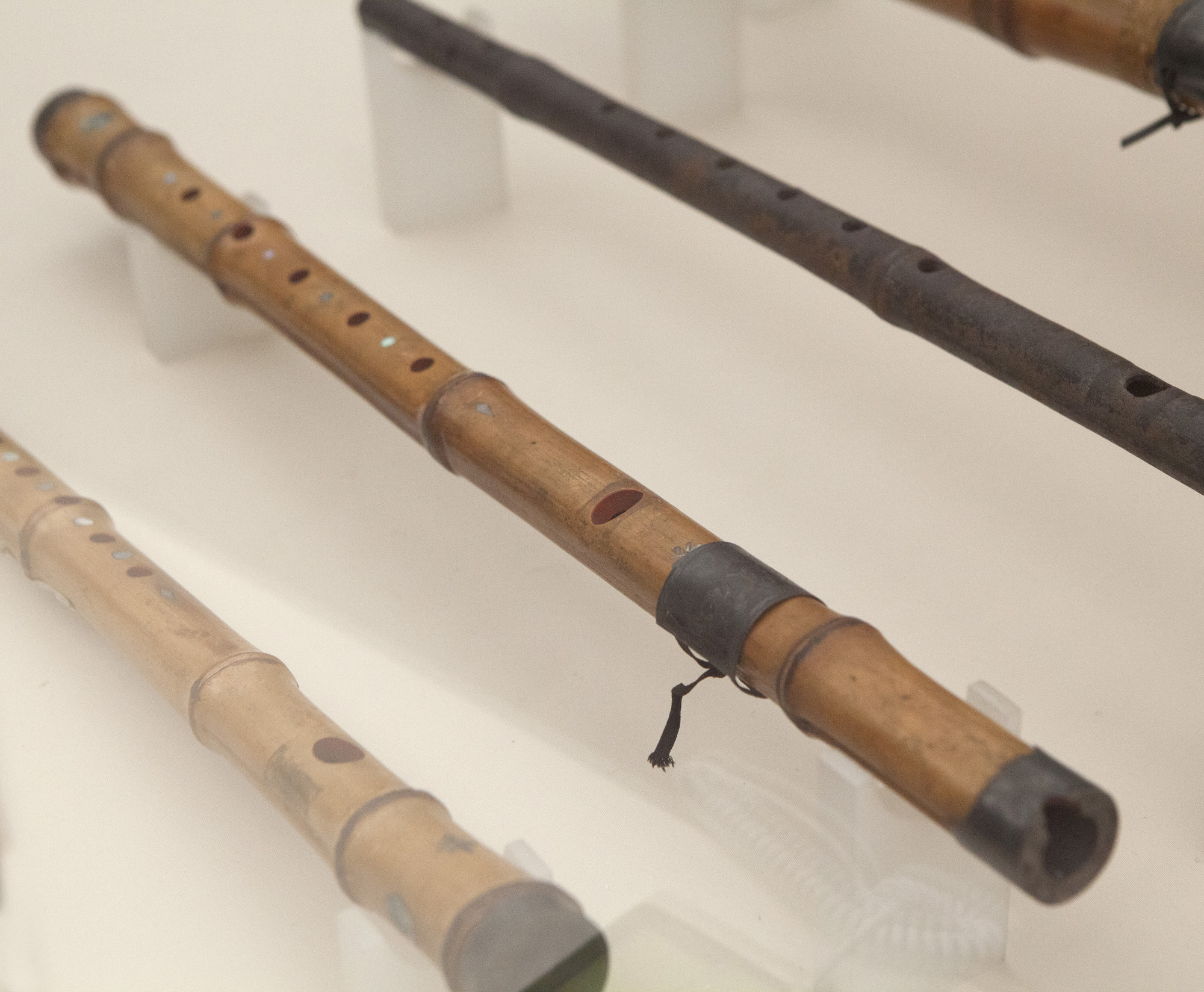

The tungso (Korean: 퉁소; sometimes tongso, transliteration of its Chinese name of dòngxiāo) is a Korean notched, end-blown vertical bamboo flute used in Korean traditional music. It is similar to the danso, but longer and larger. The hanja tong (洞) was used to describe the shape of the instrument that resembles a long cave.

The instrument is parallel to the Chinese xiao, and equivalent to its variant, dongxiao, and the Japanese name is shakuhachi. A distinctive feature of the tungso, unlike other vertical flutes is that it may have a buzzing membrane, similar to that of the Korean transverse flute, the daegeum. This is especially common in the folk variety of the instrument.

The tungso is a vertical flute made of thick, aged bamboo. Until the mid-Joseon period, tungso had been used mainly in court music, but by the end of the 19th century and the early 20th century, it became a more widely used instrument. Today, it is played in accompaniment to masked dances like the Bukcheong sajanoreum.

The tongso is made thicker and larger than danso, and the length is 55 cm and the inner diameter is 2 cm.

== Use ==
Like the daegeum, there is a special hole called cheonggong covered with a thin membrane made of reed between the breathing mouth and the hole, which produces a vibrating sound. The tungso was also played as court music, but is rarely played now.

== See also ==
- Bamboo musical instruments
- Danso
- Traditional music of Korea
- Quena
- Traditional Korean musical instruments
