= Chiba (instrument) =

Chinese woodwind instrument

Chiba (Chinese: 尺八; pinyin: chǐbā; Yale romanization: chř-bā) is a Chinese vertical end-blown flute and one type of xiao. It is one of the oldest Chinese woodwind instruments. Unlike the northern xiao, it bears resemblance to most of the southern xiao, in that it is shorter, wider, has an open mouthpiece, slightly conical, and generally has a root end. The name chiba refers to its length (1.8 feet), where chǐ is a Chinese foot unit and bā means eight.

Of the three main types of southern xiao (known as nanxiao) it is the one that most closely resembles the Japanese shakuhachi; the chiba was introduced to Japan in the early 8th century. Most nanxiao (and northern beixiao) have a "notched" mouthpiece that is either U-shaped (Cantonese style) or V-shaped (Fujianese style), whereas the chiba has an angled edge instead, giving it a far breathier sound, like that of the shakuhachi. A possible distinction between shakuhachi and chiba is that most modern shakuhachi have an ivory inlay in the mouthpiece, whereas the chiba does not. Shakuhachi also typically only have five large finger holes (four in front and thumb), whereas chiba may have from five to eight finger holes, emulating the design of other Chinese xiao.
