= Xiao (flute) =

Musical instrument

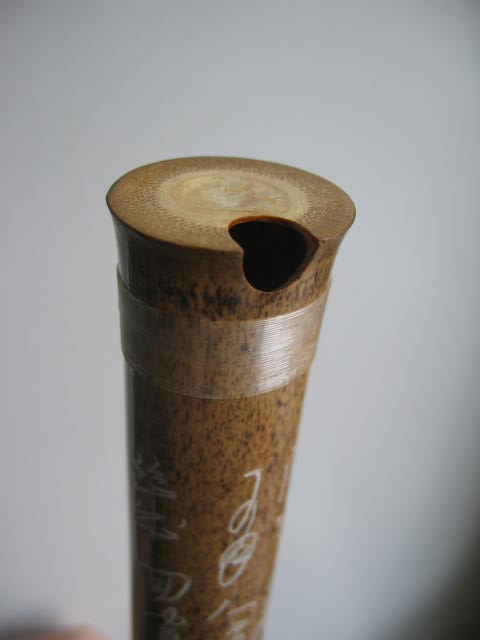
Xiao blowing hole (the hole faces away from the player, against the lower lip, making sure the top lip is not concealing the hole, when the instrument is played. Works on the same basics as blowing air over an empty bottle to create noise.)

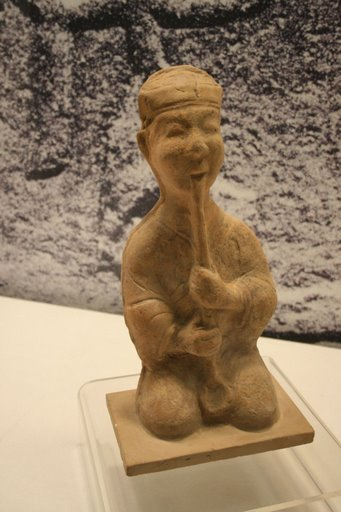
A ceramic xiao flute player excavated from an Eastern Han Dynasty (25-220 AD) tomb in Sichuan province

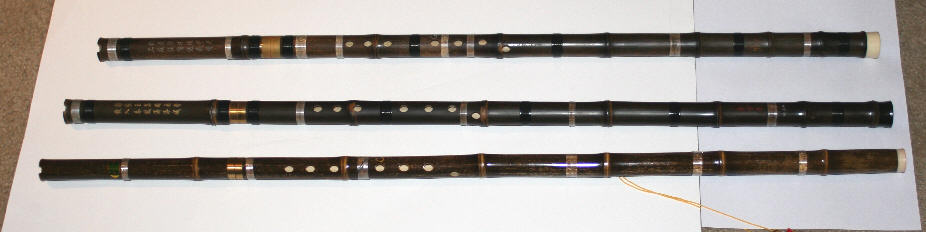
Several dongxiao in the G-key.

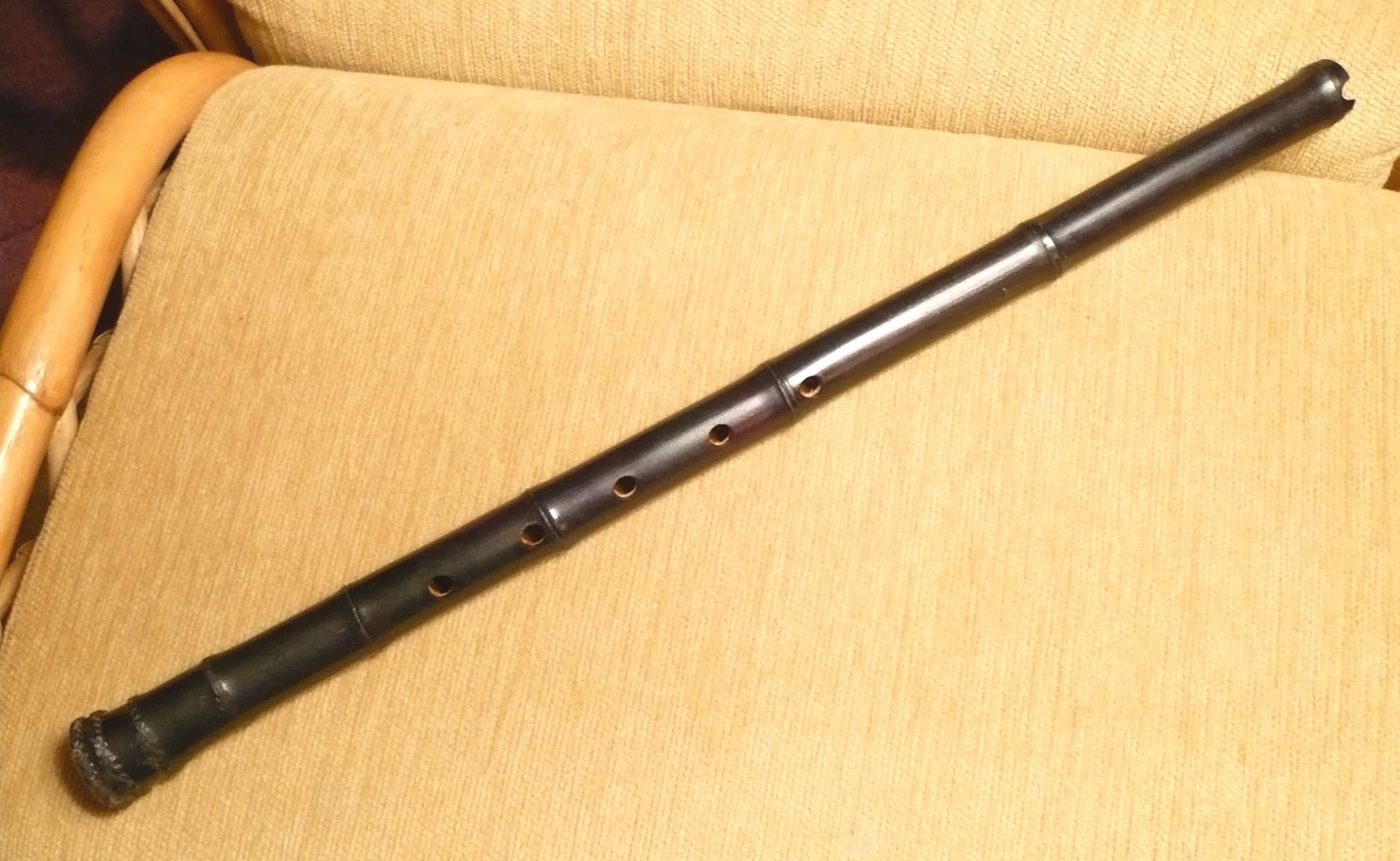
A Taiwanese xiao

The xiao (simplified Chinese: 箫; traditional Chinese: 簫; pinyin: xiāo; Wade–Giles: hsiao^{1}; Jyutping: siu1, pronounced [ɕi̯ɑ́ʊ̯]) is a Chinese vertical end-blown flute. It is generally made of bamboo. It is also sometimes called dòngxiāo (洞箫; 洞簫), dòng meaning "hole." An ancient name for the xiāo is shùzhúdí (豎竹笛, lit. "vertical bamboo flute", [ʂûtʂutǐ]) but the name xiāo in ancient times also included the side-blown bamboo flute, dizi.

The xiāo is a very ancient Chinese instrument usually thought to have developed from a simple end-blown flute used by the Qiang people of Southwest China in ancient period. In the oral traditions of the Xiao, practitioners and poets say its sound resembles the sweetness of the Phoenix's call, the king of birds in Chinese belief.

In modern society, there has been an increase of cultural emphasis of the xiao flute in the Guizhou province. That is due to the presence of Yuping Flute Products there and its developing of "xiao flute culture". But the xiao flute is seen mostly in that case as a stepping stone for further developments of the Shaxiao flute.

== Organology ==
Xiao are mostly made of bamboo, the best being 'black bamboo' or 紫竹; zizhu; 'purple bamboo'. Sometimes, the xiao is made of solid wood that has been carved and hollowed out. They can either be made plain, or have a horn inlay at the end and/or various inscriptions along the shaft. Usually, nylon wire bindings along the shaft are wrapped on which attempts to stabilize the bamboo and prevent cracking. Some players tie a tassel to dangle from one of the lower sound holes, purely for decorative purposes.

Xiao are today most often pitched in the key of G (with the D above middle C being the lowest note, with all fingers covered), although xiao in other less common keys are also available, most commonly in the key of F. More traditional xiao have six finger holes, while most modern ones have eight; the additional holes do not extend the instrument's range but instead make it easier to play notes such as F natural. There are a further four (sometimes two or six) sound holes situated at the bottom third of the length of the xiao. The blowing hole is at the top end, it may be cut into a 'U' shape, a "V" shape, or at an angle (with or without bone/ivory inlay.) Some xiao have the blowing end entirely cut off, so the player must use the space between their chin and lips to cover the hole fully. There may be a metal joint between the blow hole and the top finger hole for tuning purposes and sometimes also between the last finger hole and the end. The length of the xiao ranges from around 45 cm to over 1.25 m but is usually around 75–85 cm. Usually, shorter xiaos are more difficult to play because of the need to control one's breath more accurately. The angle to play the xiao is around 45 degrees from the body.

== Varieties ==
In addition to the standard dongxiao, there are other types of xiao which includes (but not limited to):

The bei xiao (北箫; 北簫), "Northern Xiao") is the common variant of Xiao in the North. It is characterized by its longer construction usually made of Purple Bamboo. The Bei Xiao's tone is less thick than the Nan Xiao, as it does not include the root of bamboo. Its mouthpiece is commonly in a U shape.

The qin xiao (琴箫; 琴簫) is a version of the beixiao, which is narrower and generally in the key of F with eight smaller finger holes, used to accompany the guqin. The narrowness of the qin xiao makes the tone softer, making it more suitable to play with the qin which is a very quiet instrument and a normal beixiao would drown out its low volume.

The nanxiao (南箫; 南簫), "Southern Xiao"), sometimes called chiba (尺八, "foot-eight", an old name still used for the Japanese shakuhachi) is a short xiao with open mouthpiece used in the Nanyin, the local Fujianese opera from Quanzhou. Typically, the end incorporates a part of the root of the bamboo. This variant of Xiao is used in the South of China and in Taiwan, usually made of Taiwanese bamboo.

== Related instruments ==
A separate instrument, the paixiao (排箫; 排簫; páixiāo) is a panpipe which was used in ancient China and which, although it remains unusual, has recently had something of a comeback.

The Japanese shakuhachi and hocchiku, Vietnamese tiêu, and the Korean tungso and danso (also spelled tanso), are descended from earlier forms of the Chinese xiao.

== See also ==
- Bamboo musical instruments
- Chinese flutes
- End-blown flute
- Music of China
- Traditional Chinese musical instruments
