= Bamboo musical instruments =

Musical instruments, commonly flutes, made of bamboo

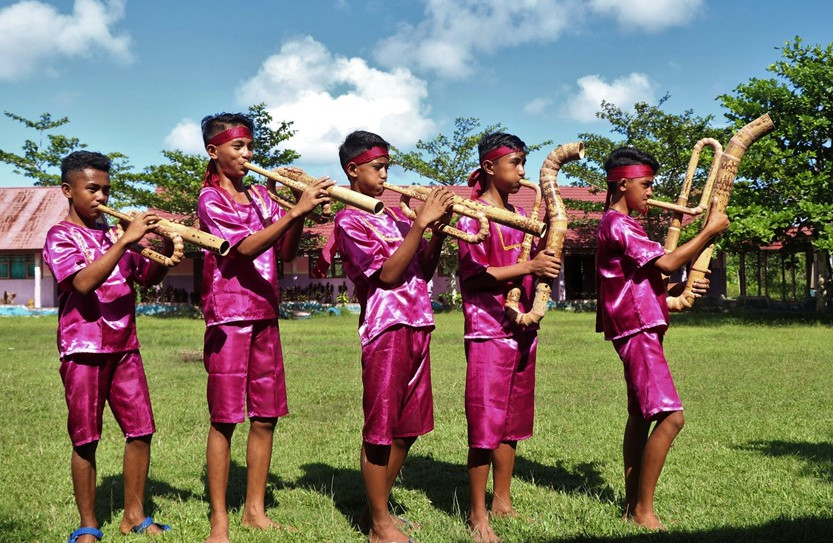
Wind instruments made of bamboo played by students in Talaud, North Sulawesi, Indonesia

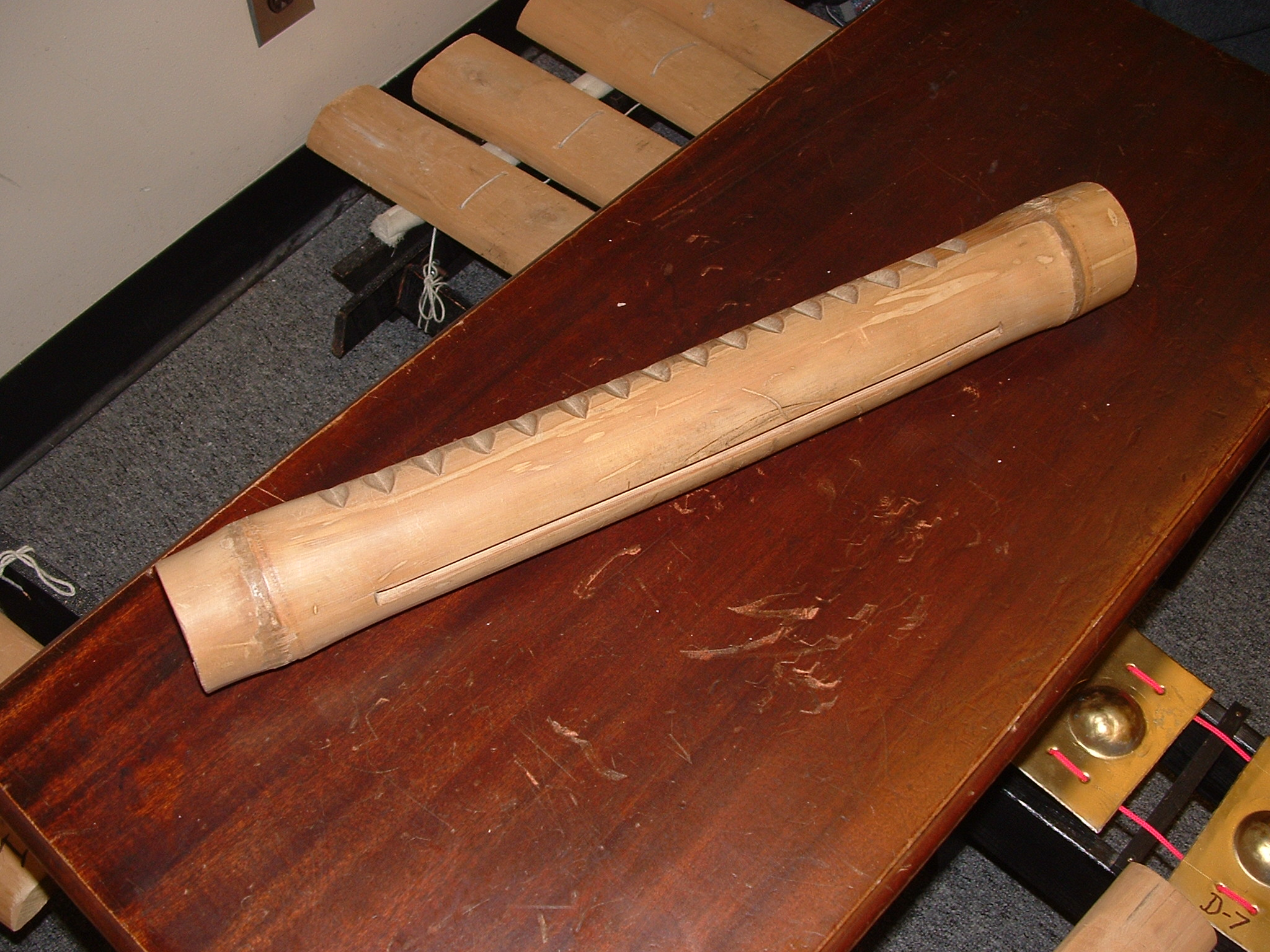
An example of a slit drum or scraper from the Philippines known as a kagul by the Maguindanaon people

Bamboo's natural hollow form makes it an obvious choice for many musical instruments. In South and South East Asia, traditional uses of bamboo the instrument include various types of woodwind instruments, such as flutes, and devices like xylophones and organs, which require resonating sections. In some traditional instruments bamboo is the primary material, while others combine bamboo with other materials such as wood and leather.

== Overview ==
Bamboo has been used to create a variety of instruments including flutes, mouth organs, saxophones, trumpets, drums and xylophones.

=== Flutes ===
See Bamboo flutes

There are numerous types of bamboo flutes made all over the world, such as the dizi, xiao, shakuhachi, palendag and jinghu. In the Indian subcontinent, it is a popular musical instrument played both by poor and renowned musicians. It is associated with Krishna, who is portrayed holding a bansuri. Four of the instruments used in Polynesia for traditional hula are made of bamboo: nose flute, rattle, stamping pipes and the jaw harp. Bamboo may be used in the construction of the Australian didgeridoo instead of the more traditional eucalyptus wood.

=== Other bamboo instruments ===
In Indonesia and the Philippines, bamboo has been used for making various kinds of musical instruments, including the kolintang, angklung and bumbong. Bamboo is also used to make slit drums. Traditional Philippine bamboo ensemble use a variety of bamboo musical instruments, including the marimba, angklung, panpipes and bumbong, as well as bamboo versions of western instruments, such as clarinets, saxophones, and tubas. The Las Piñas Bamboo Organ in the Philippines has pipes made of bamboo culms. The modern amplified string instrument, the Chapman stick, is also constructed using bamboo. The khene (also spelled khaen, kaen and khen; Lao: ແຄນ, Thai: แคน) is a mouth organ of Lao origin whose pipes, which are usually made of bamboo, are connected with a small, hollowed-out hardwood reservoir into which air is blown, creating a sound similar to that of the cello. In the Indian Ocean island of Madagascar, the valiha, a long tube zither made of a single bamboo stalk, is considered the national instrument.

Bamboo has also recently been used for the manufacture of guitars and ukuleles. Bamboo Ukuleles are constructed of solid cross laminated bamboo strips not plywood. The bamboo solid wood strips are similar to bamboo manufactured flooring.

== Gallery ==
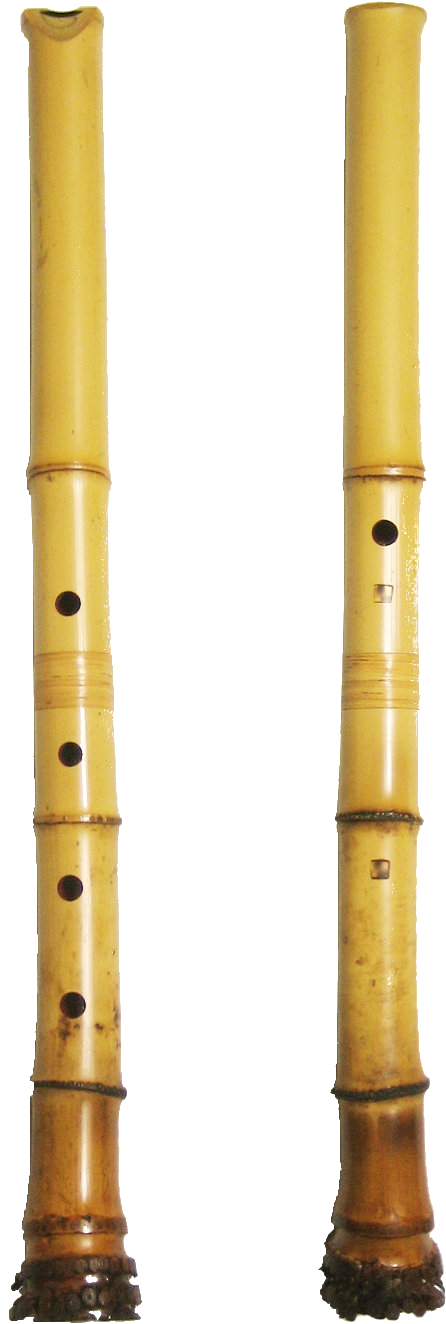
Top and bottom-side views of a shakuhachi, end-blown bamboo flutes from Japan

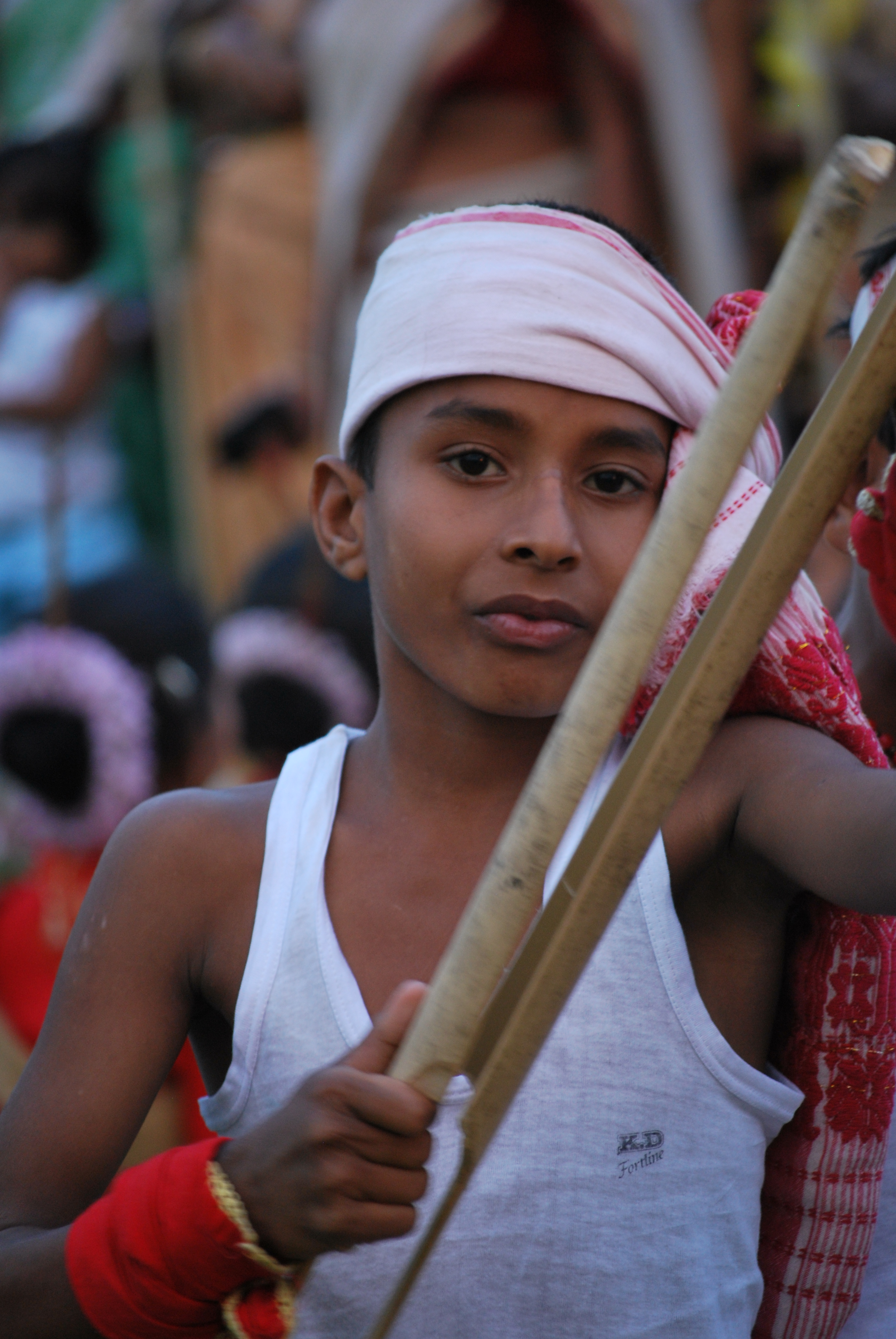
Toka, bamoo clapper, Assam, Nepal

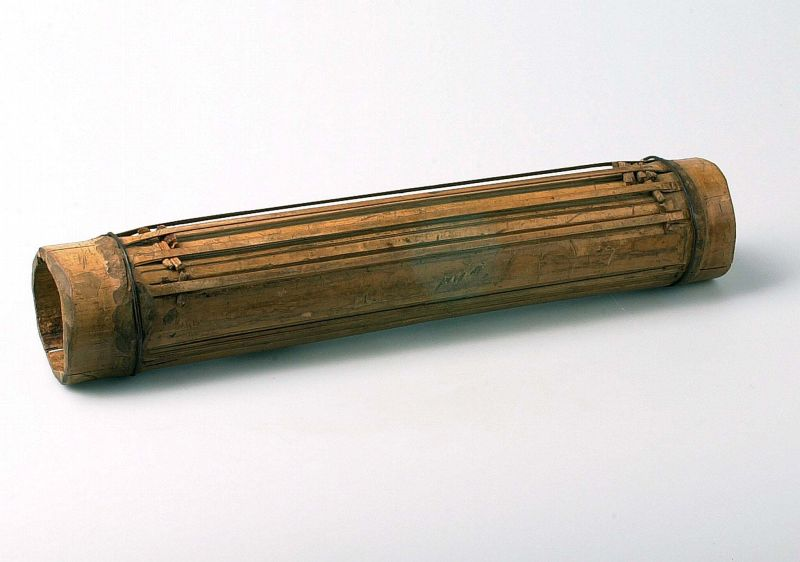
Bamboo tanggetang tube zither, Sumatra

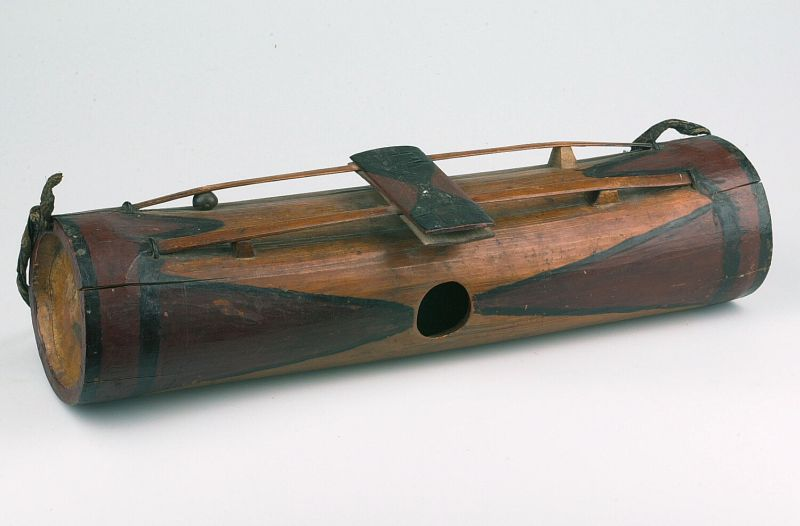
Bamboo tube-zither drum

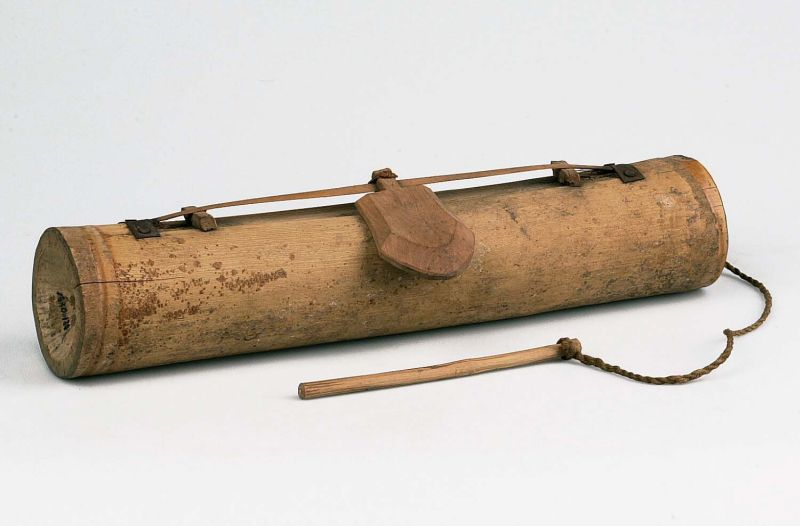
Bamboo tube-zither drum

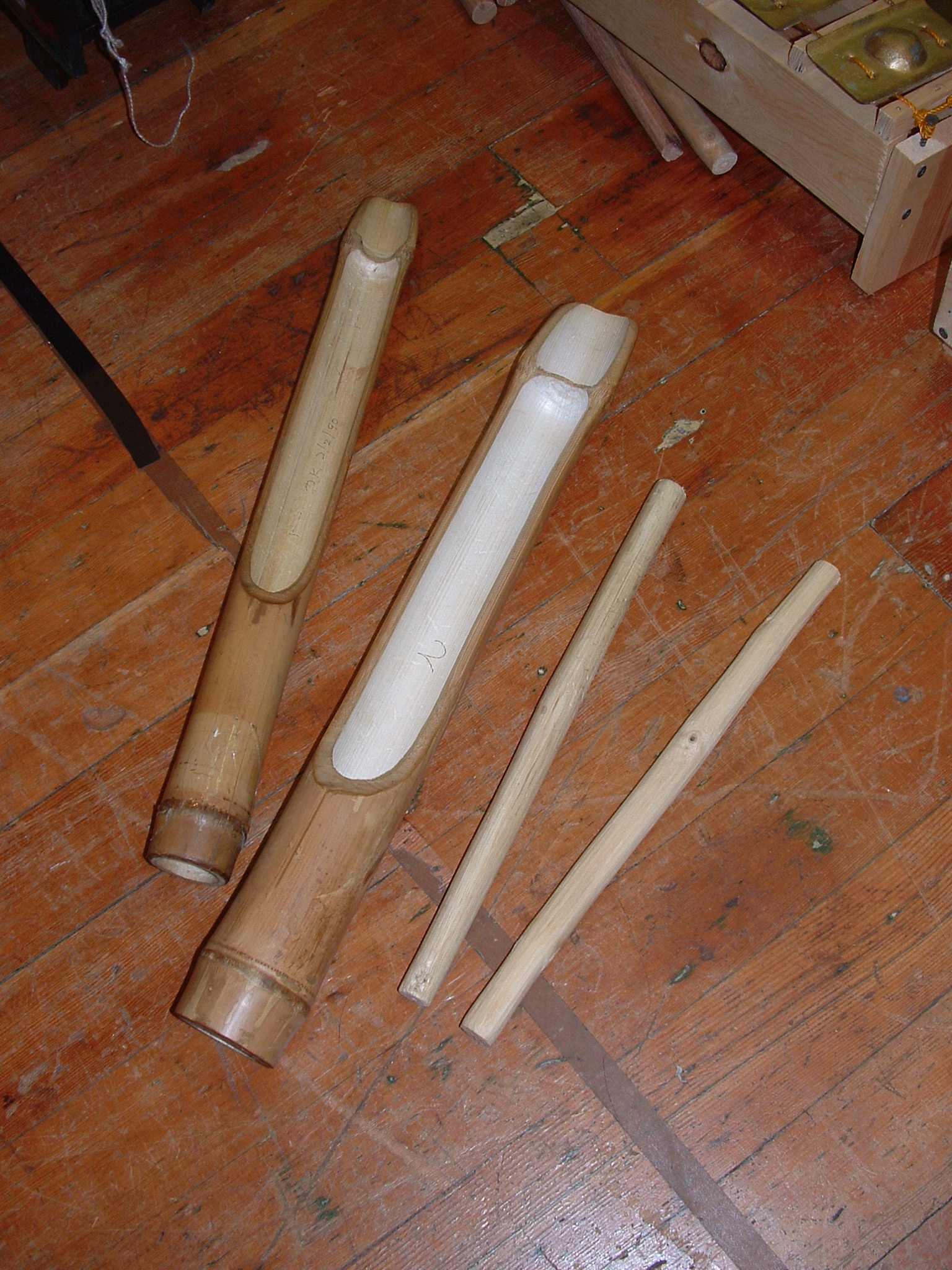
Bamboo gong or slit drum, Agung a tamlang, Philippines

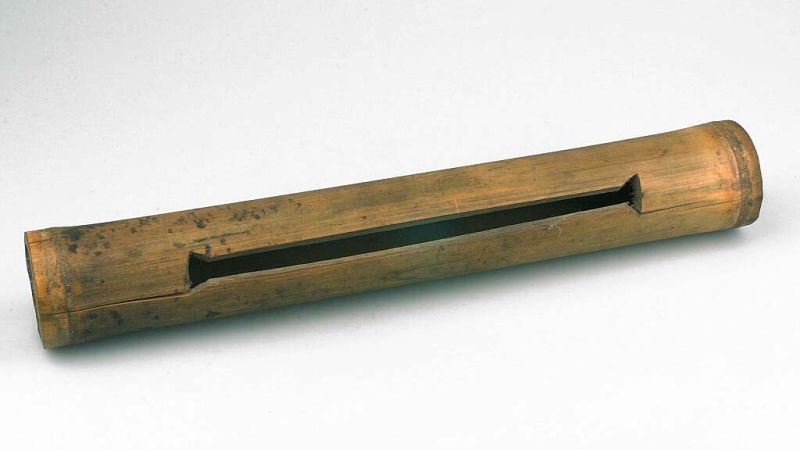
Indonesian slit drum

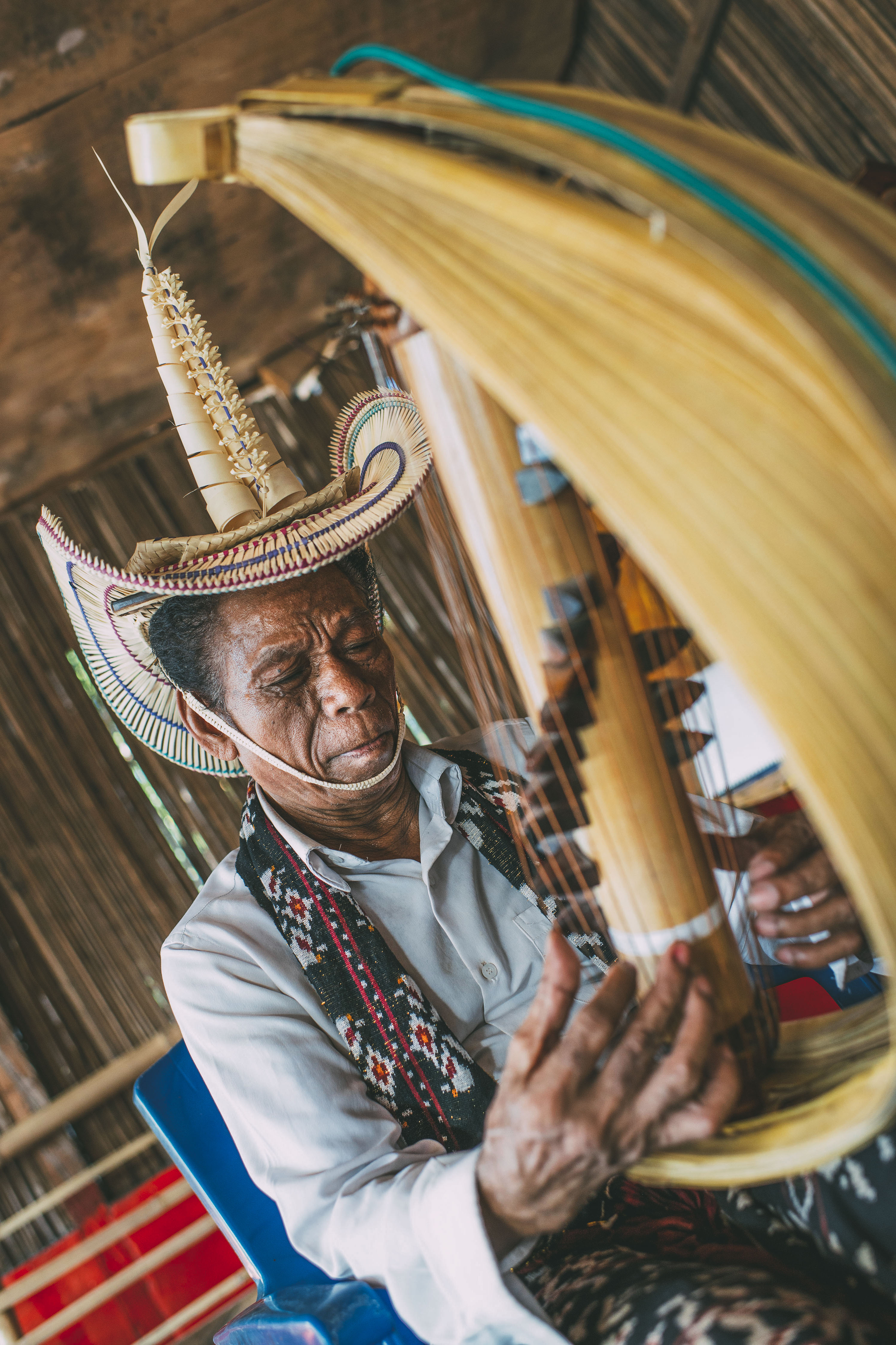
Sasando tube zither

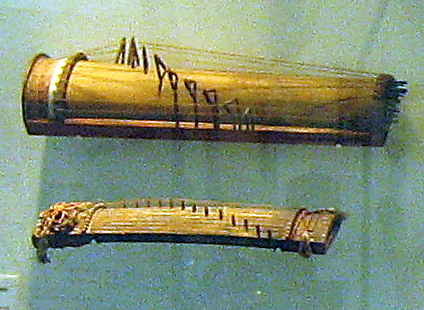
Bamboo half-tube zithers

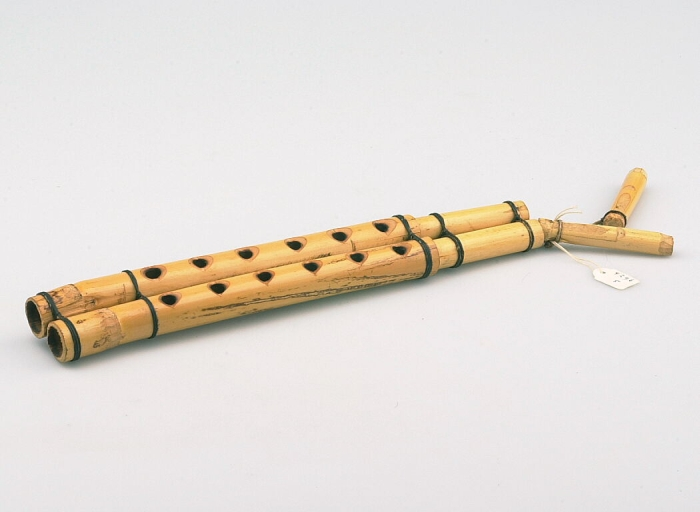
Double-reed clarinet, North Africa

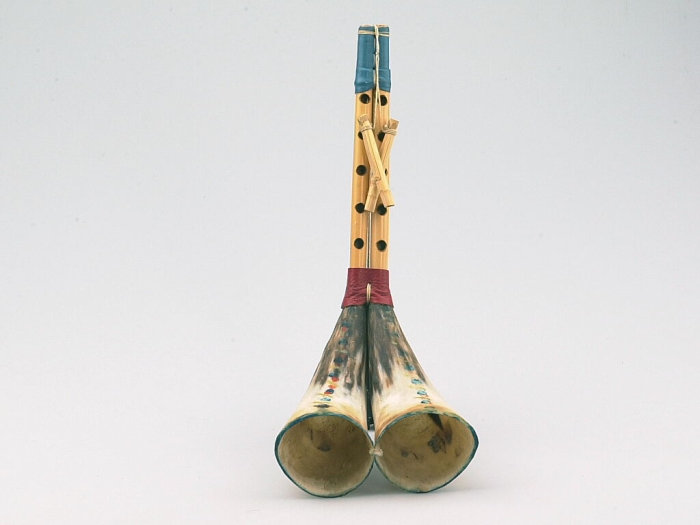
Magruna double reed clarinet, Libya

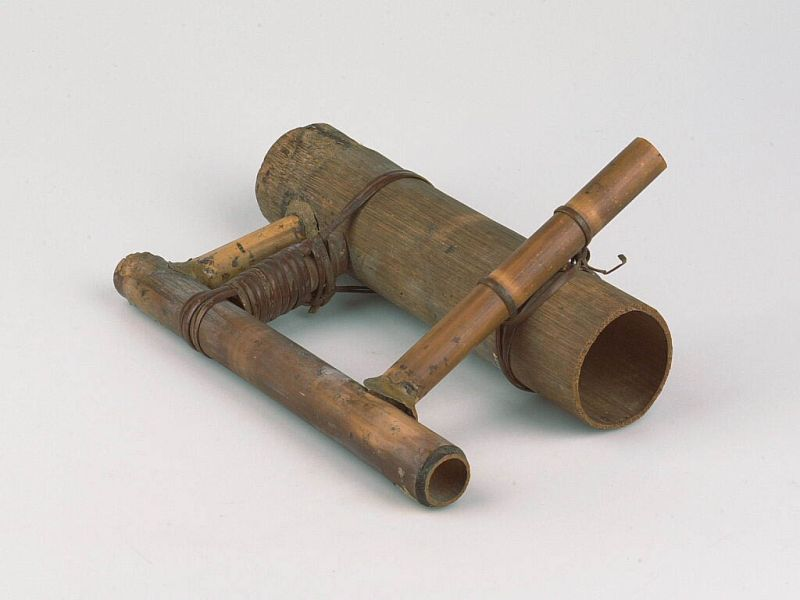
Bamboo trumpet, Sulawesi, Indonesia

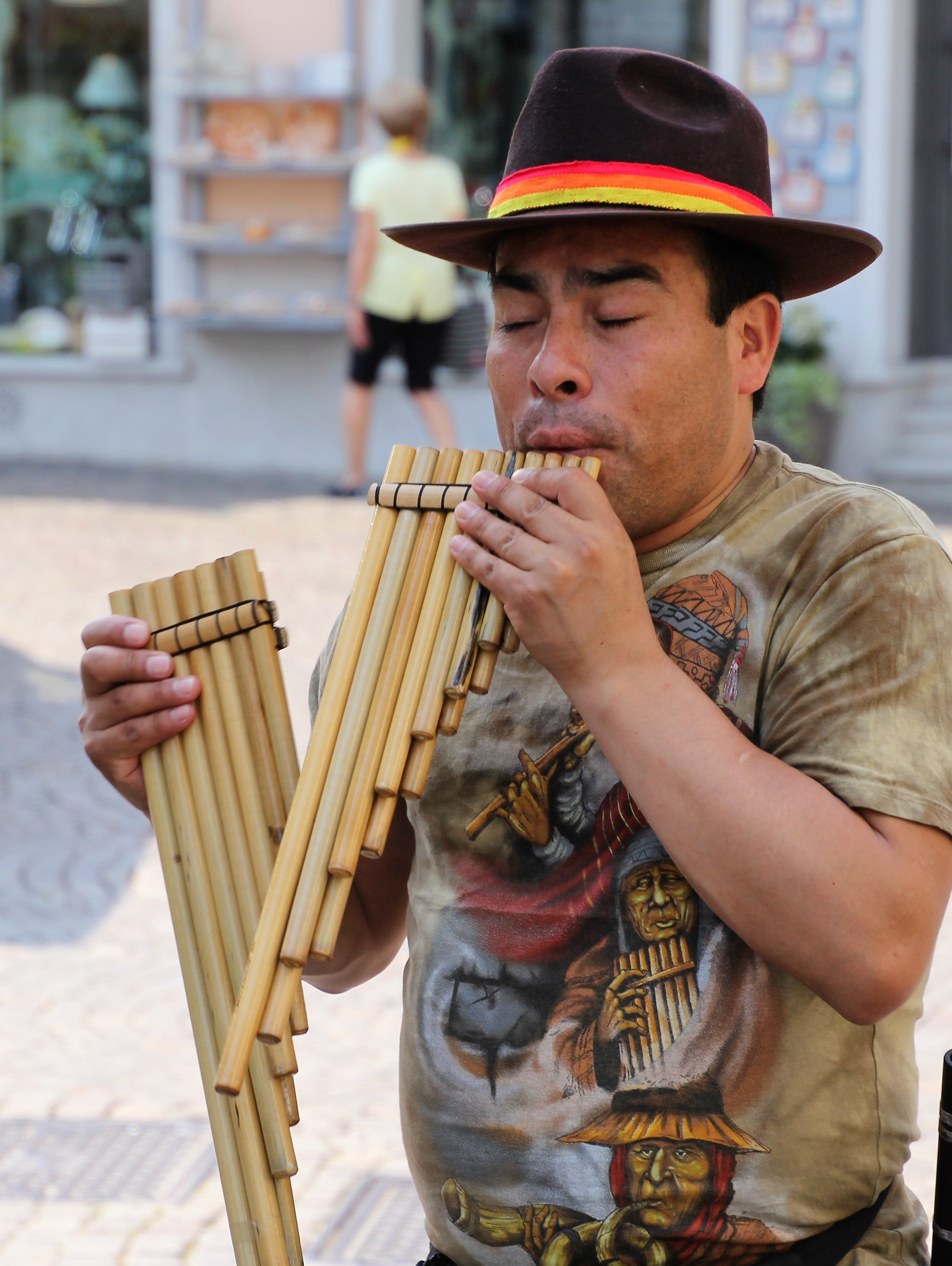
Siku, Pan pipes, Bolivia or Peru, Andes Mountains

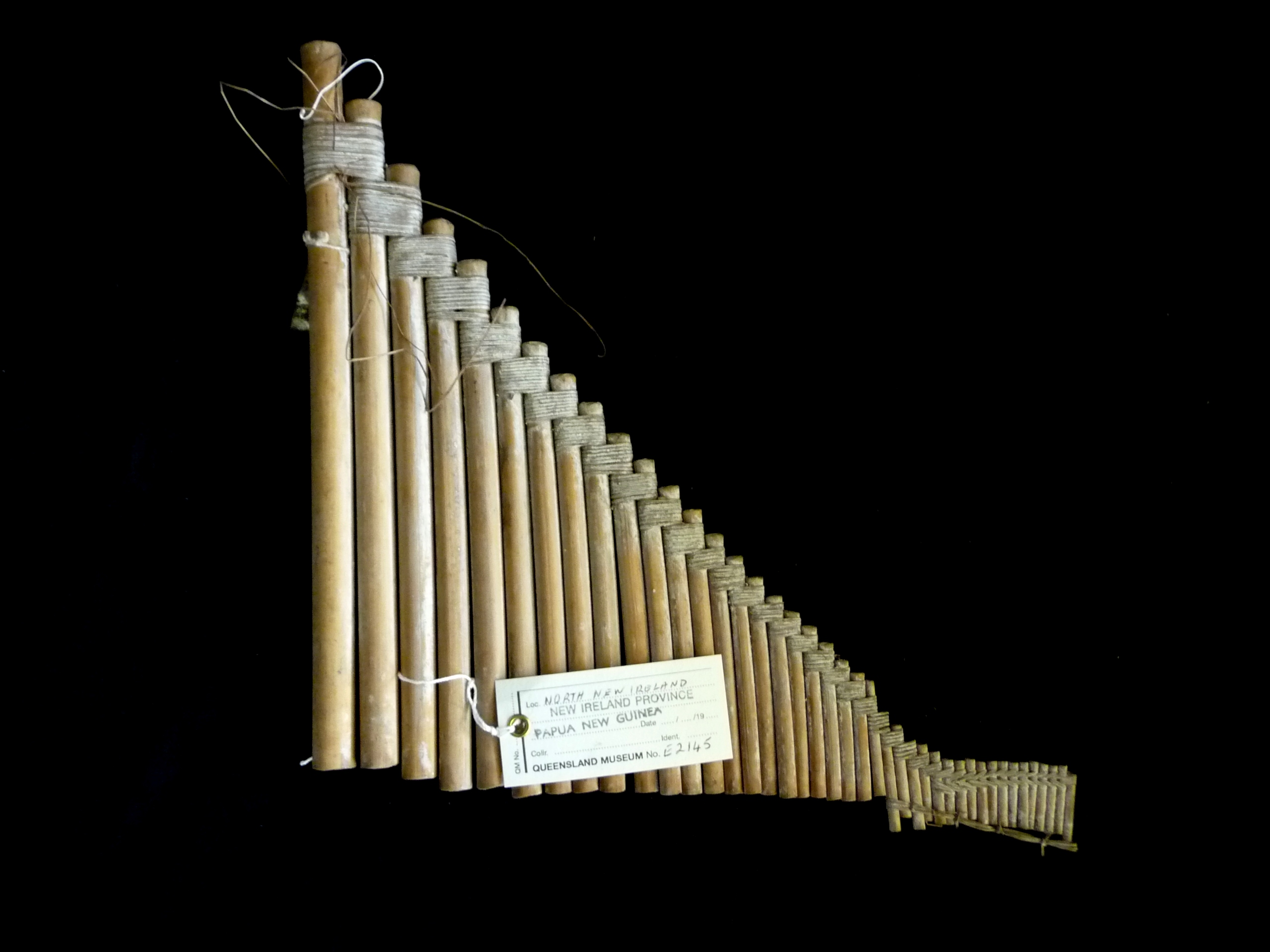
Pan pipes, New Ireland Province, Papua New Guinea

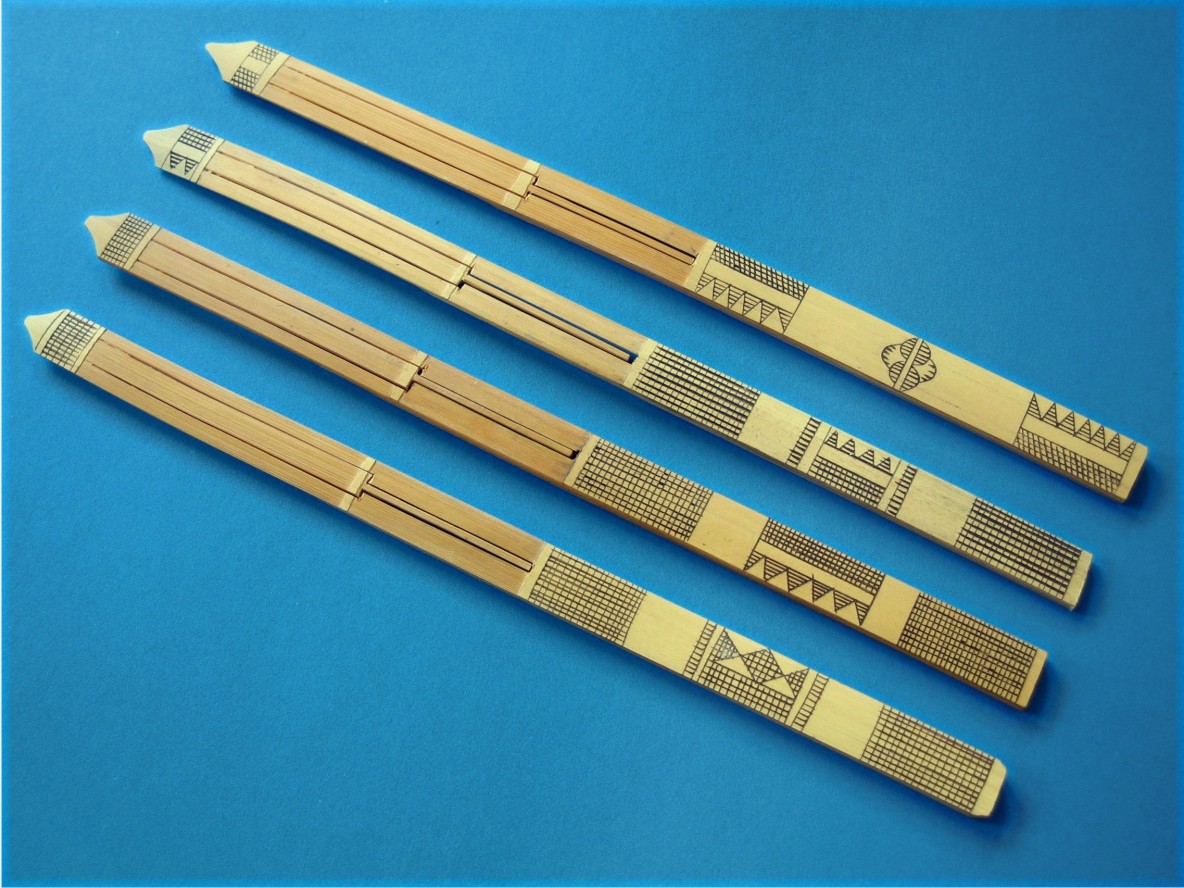
Bamboo Jew's Harp

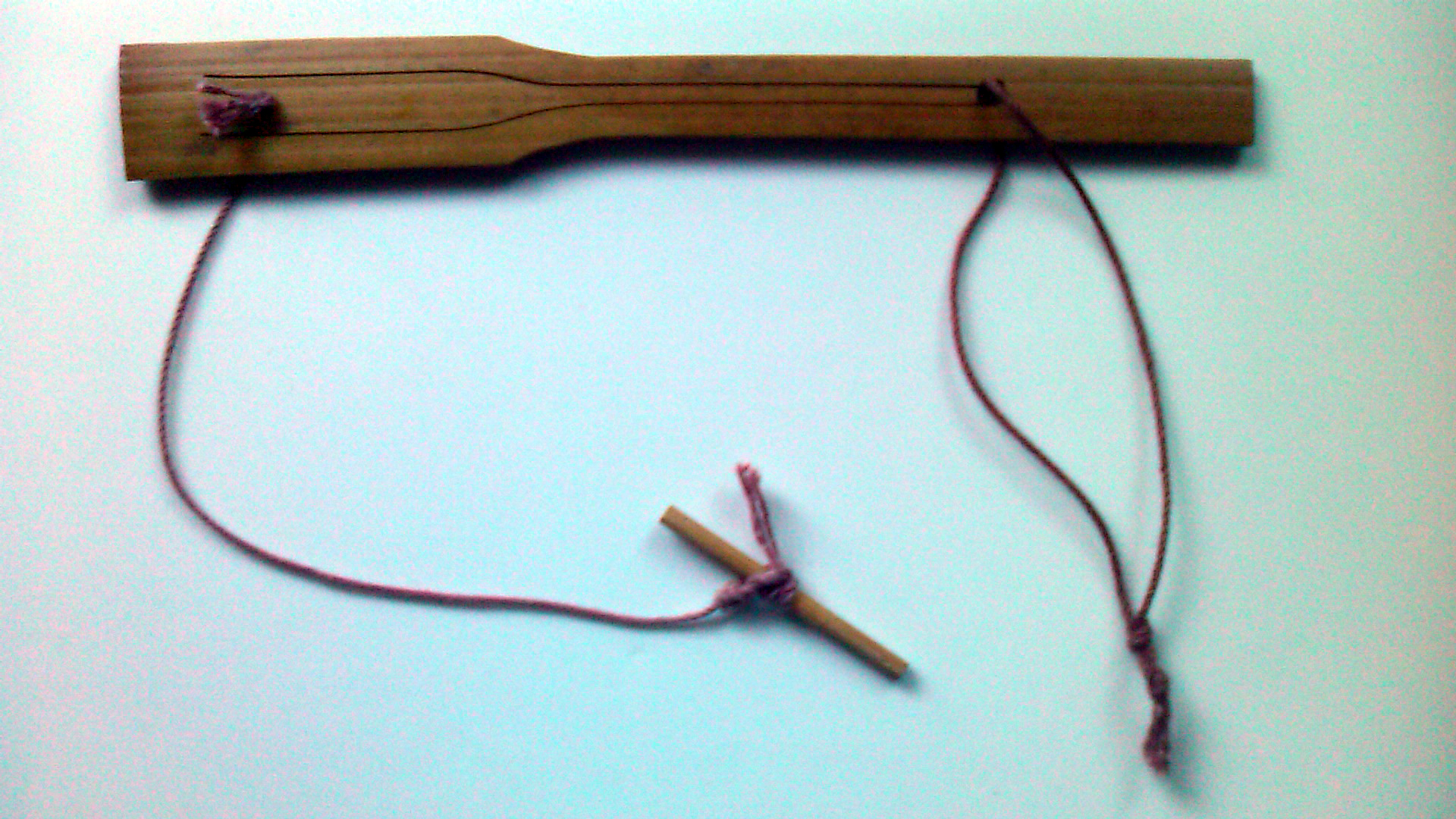
Ainu Jew's Harpo

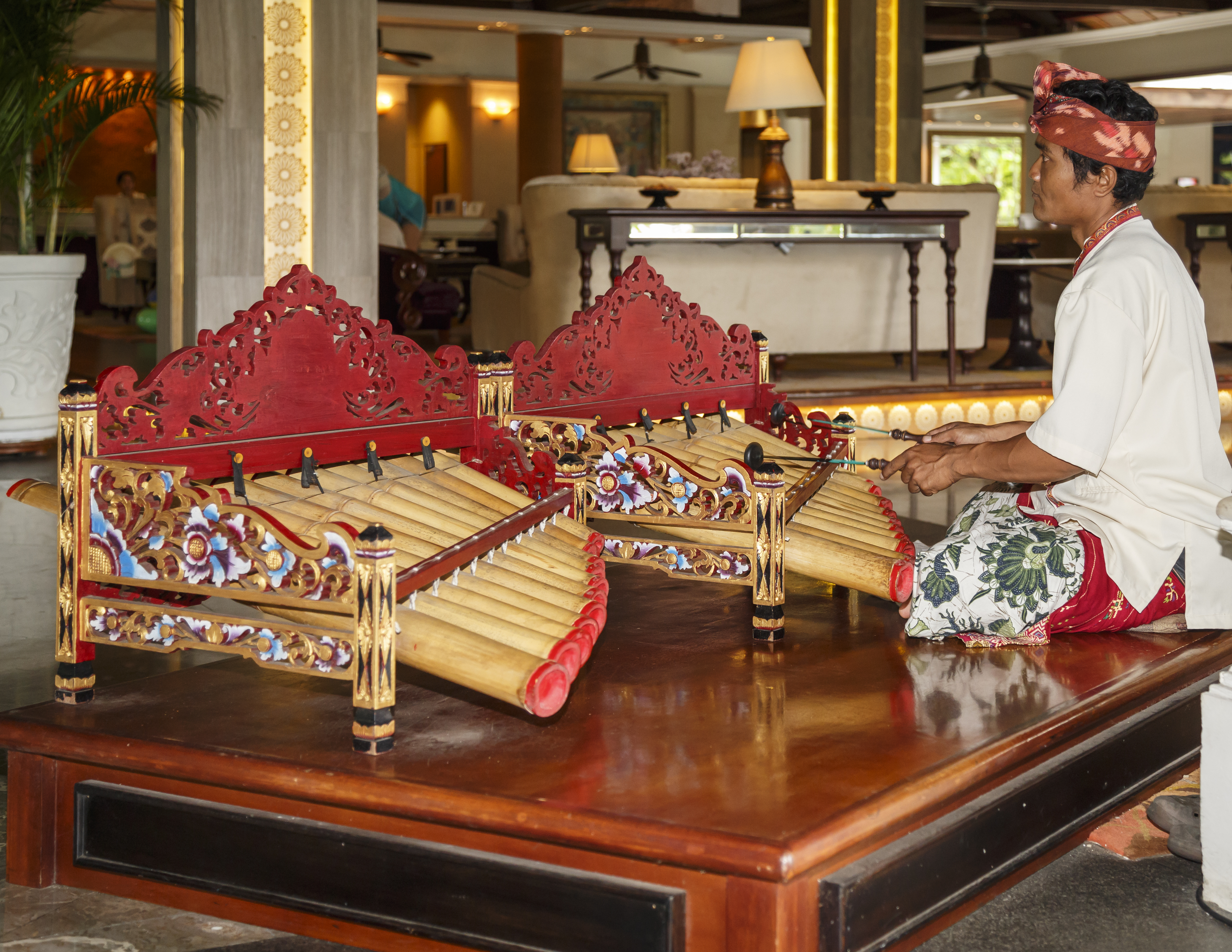
Bali Indonesia Xylophone-player, photo by CEphoto, Uwe Aranas

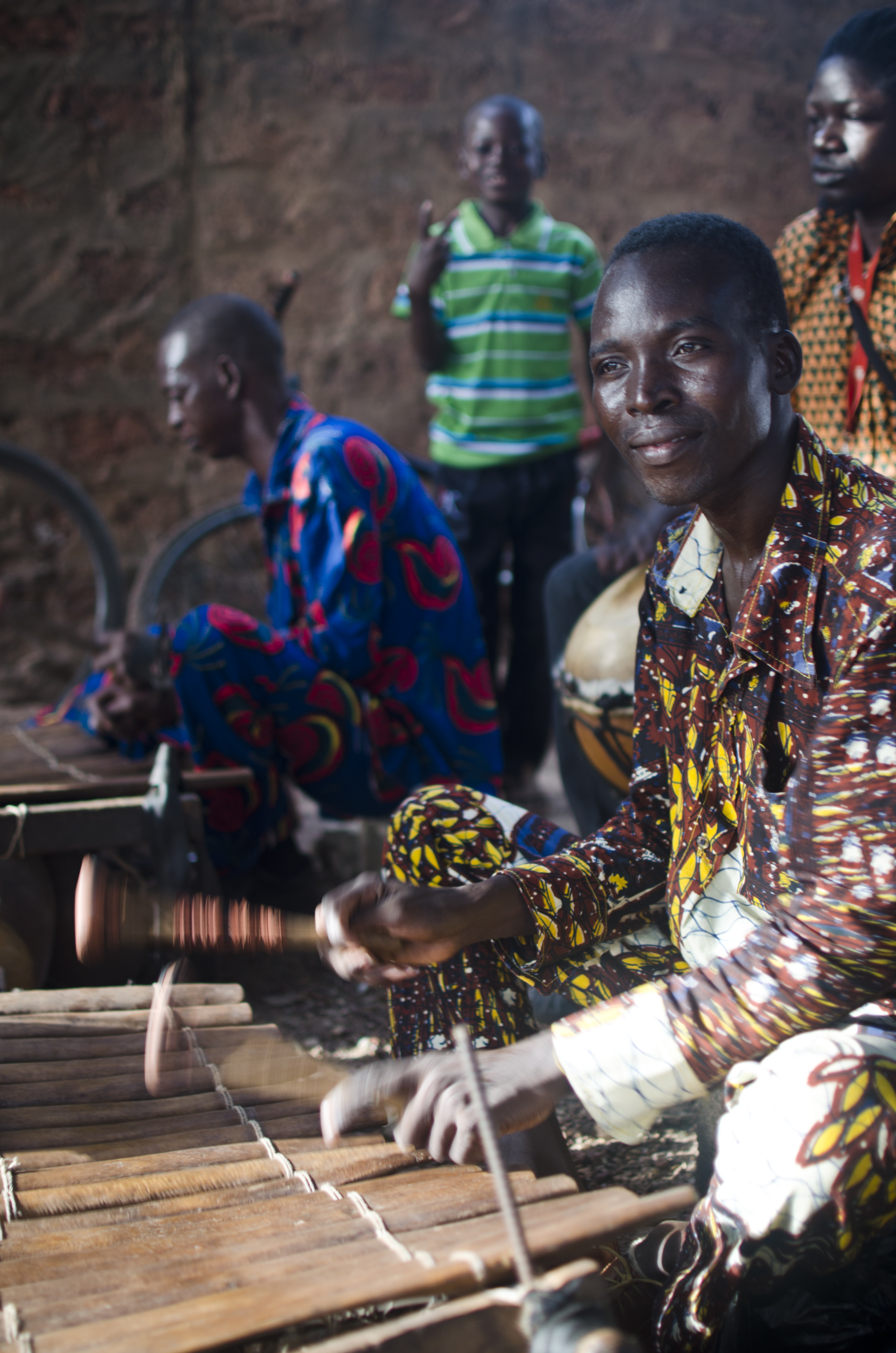
Bala, African xylophone

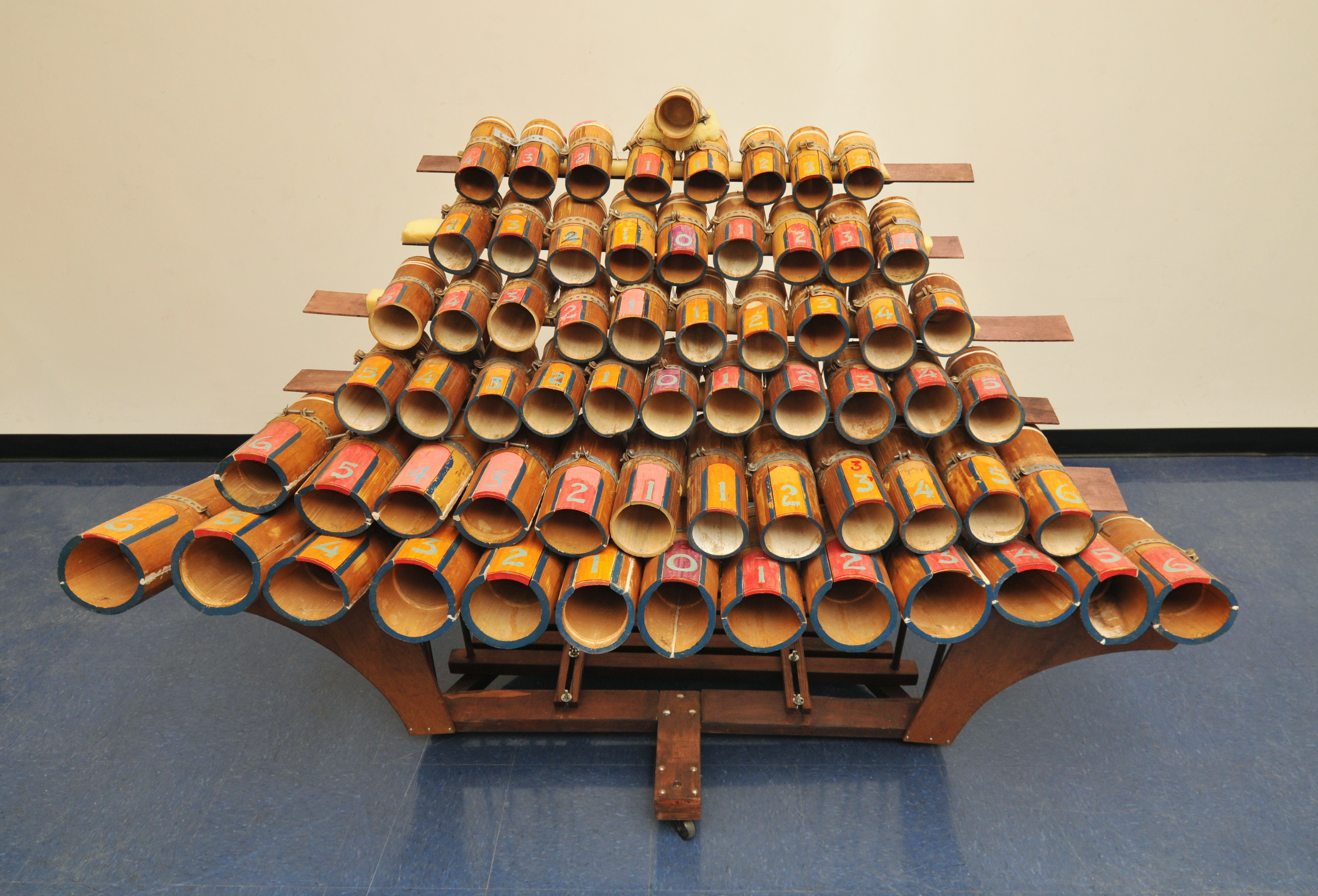
Bamboo marimba, one of the instruments created by Harry Partch

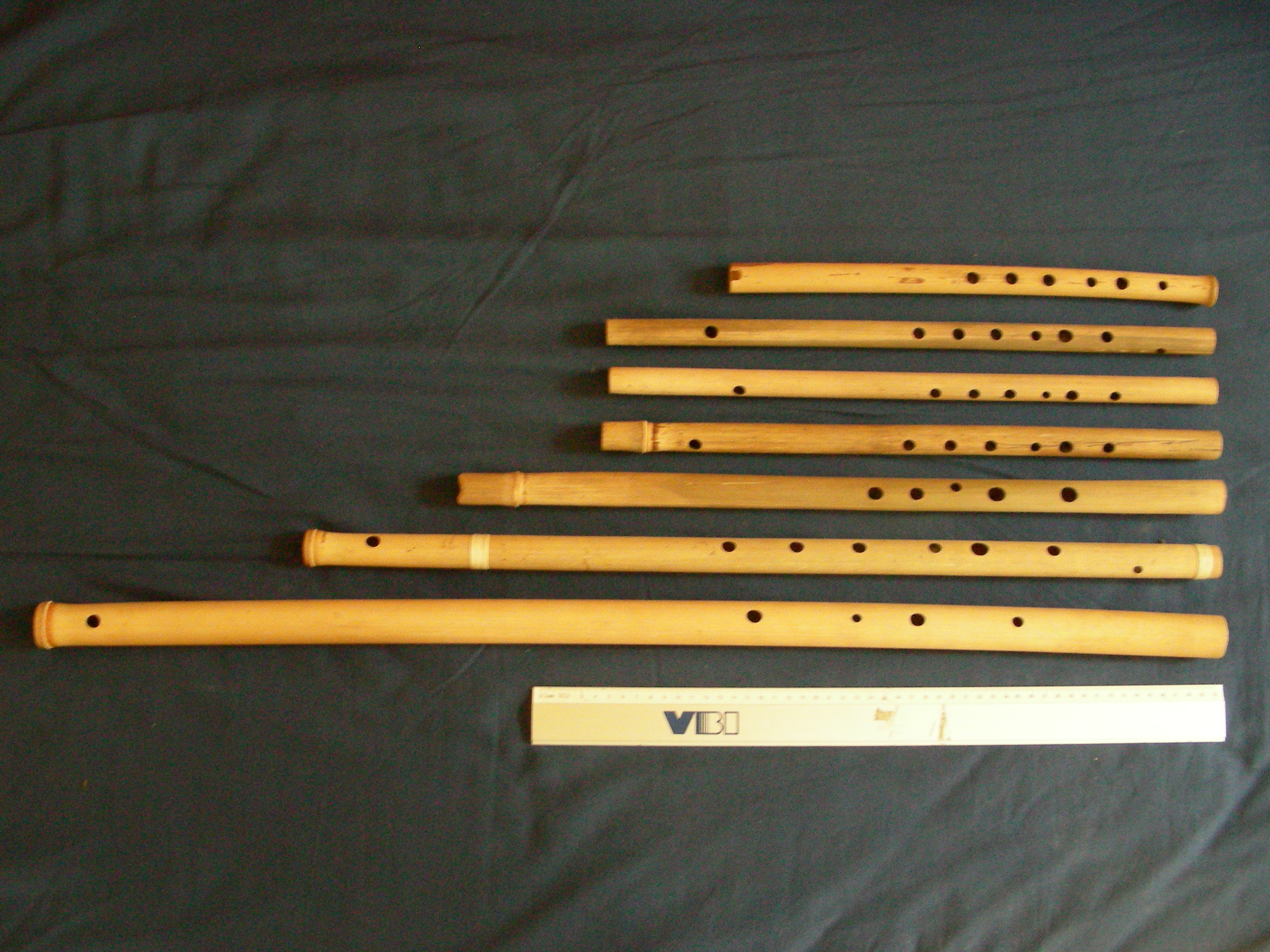
Bamboo flutes

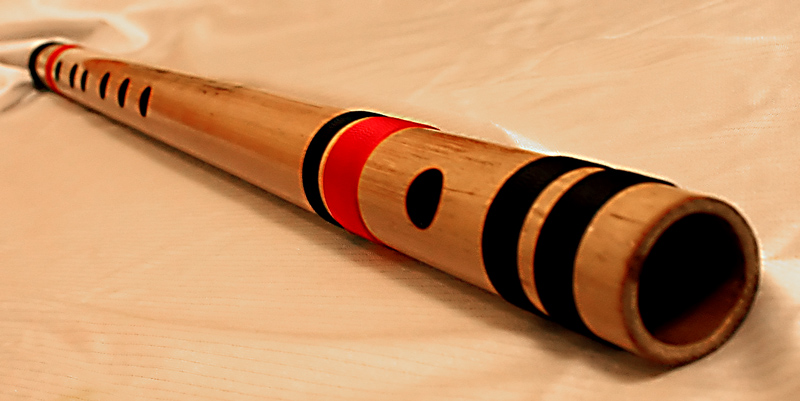
Bansuri, Indian subcontinent

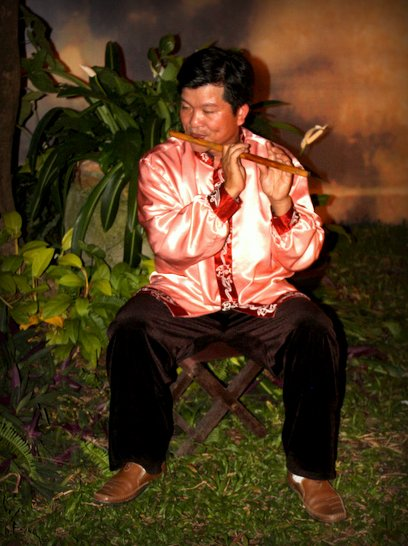
Sáo, Vietnamese flute

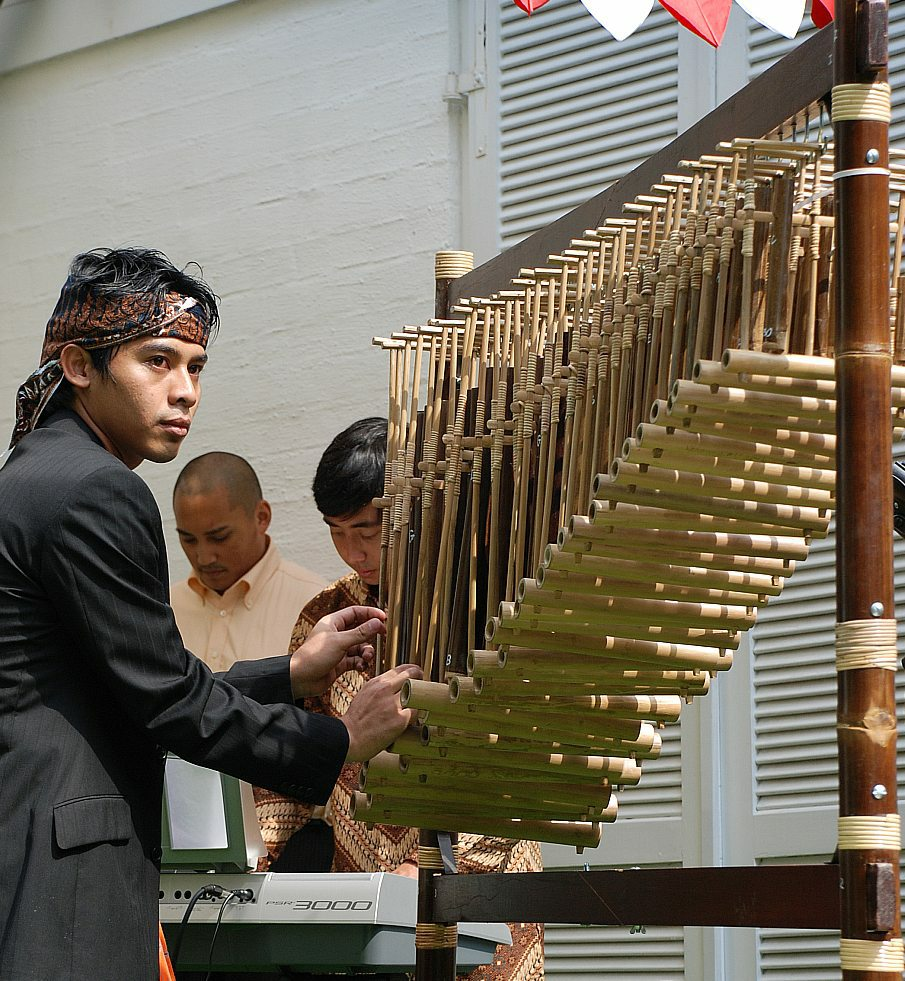
Angklung, Indonesia

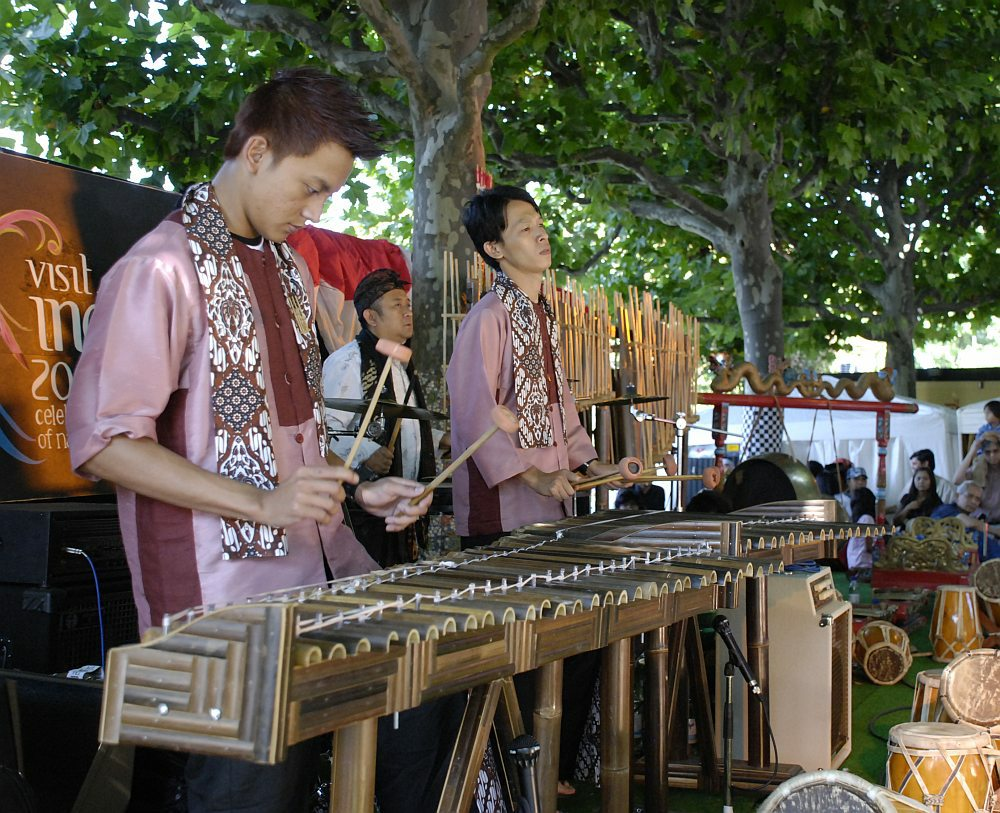
Kolintang xylophone and angklung, Indonesia

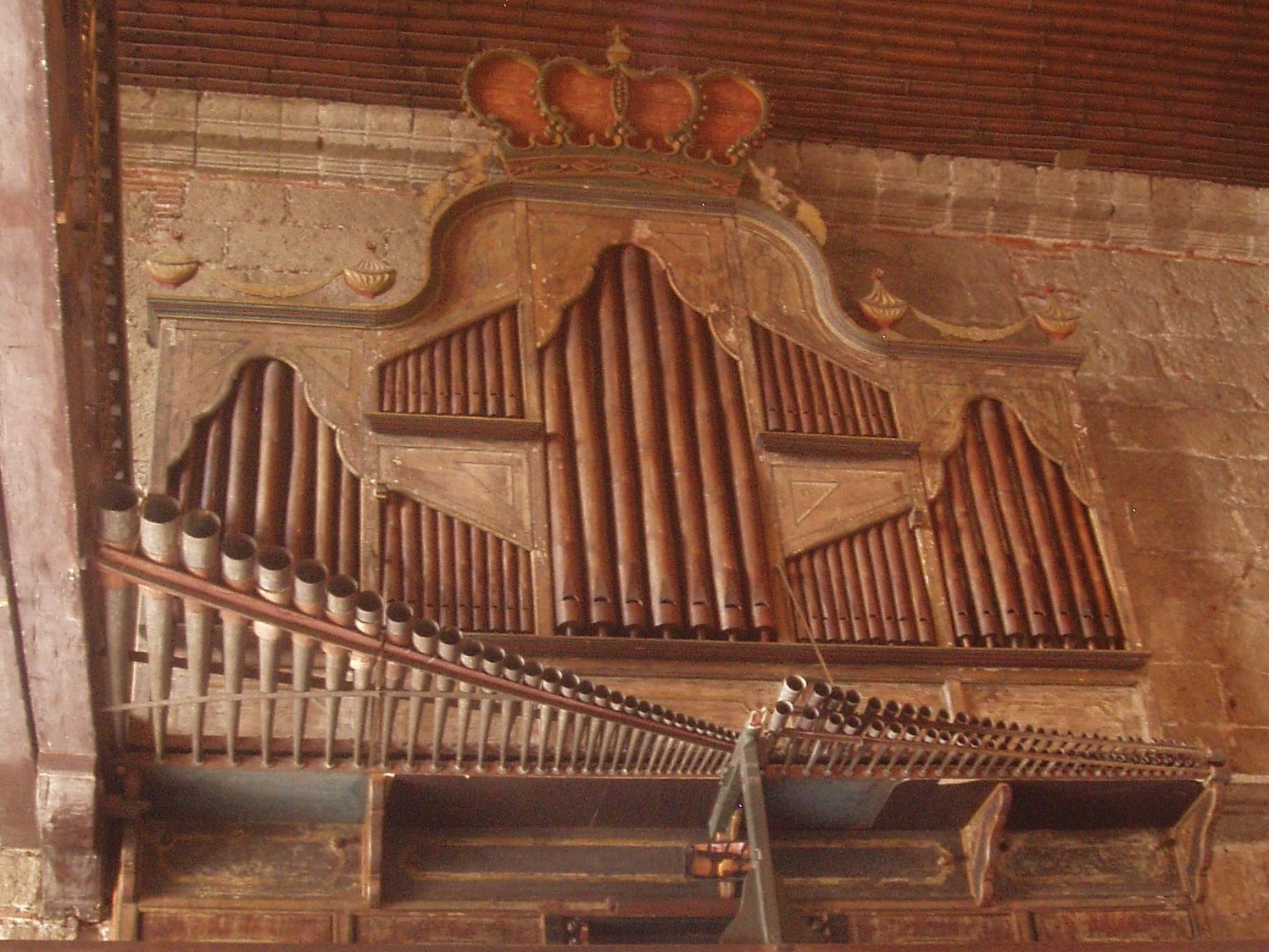
Bamboo organ, Saint Joseph Parish Church, Las Piñas, Metro Manila, Philippine

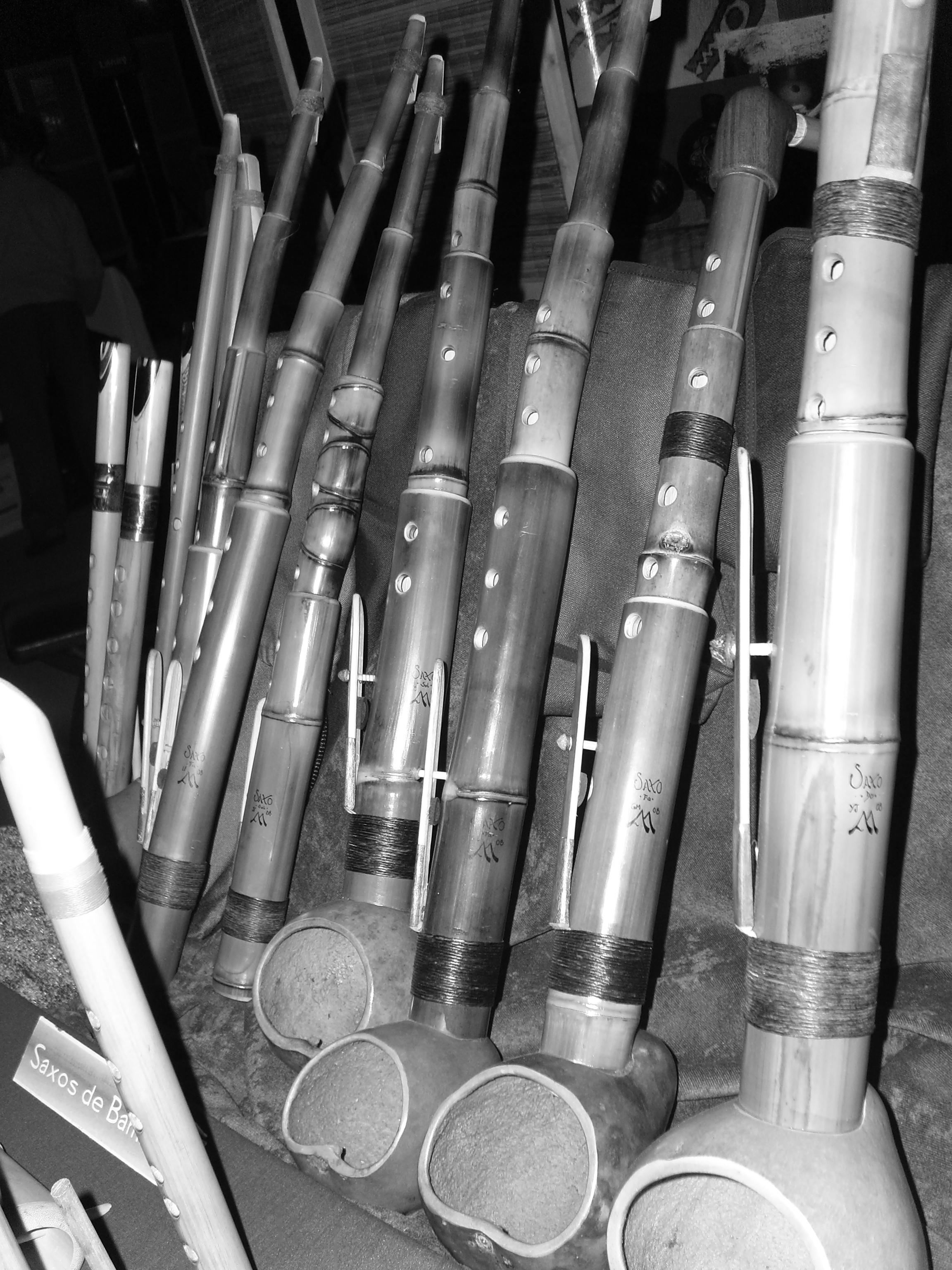
Bamboo saxophone, Argentina

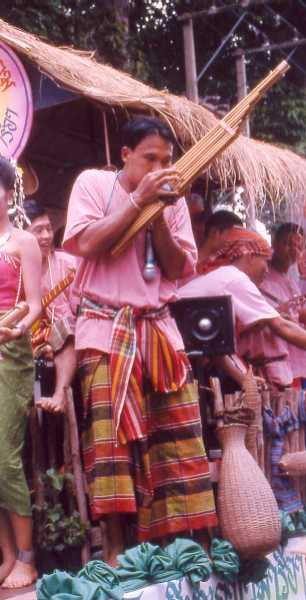
Khene, mouth organ, Thailand, Vietnam, Cambodia, Laos

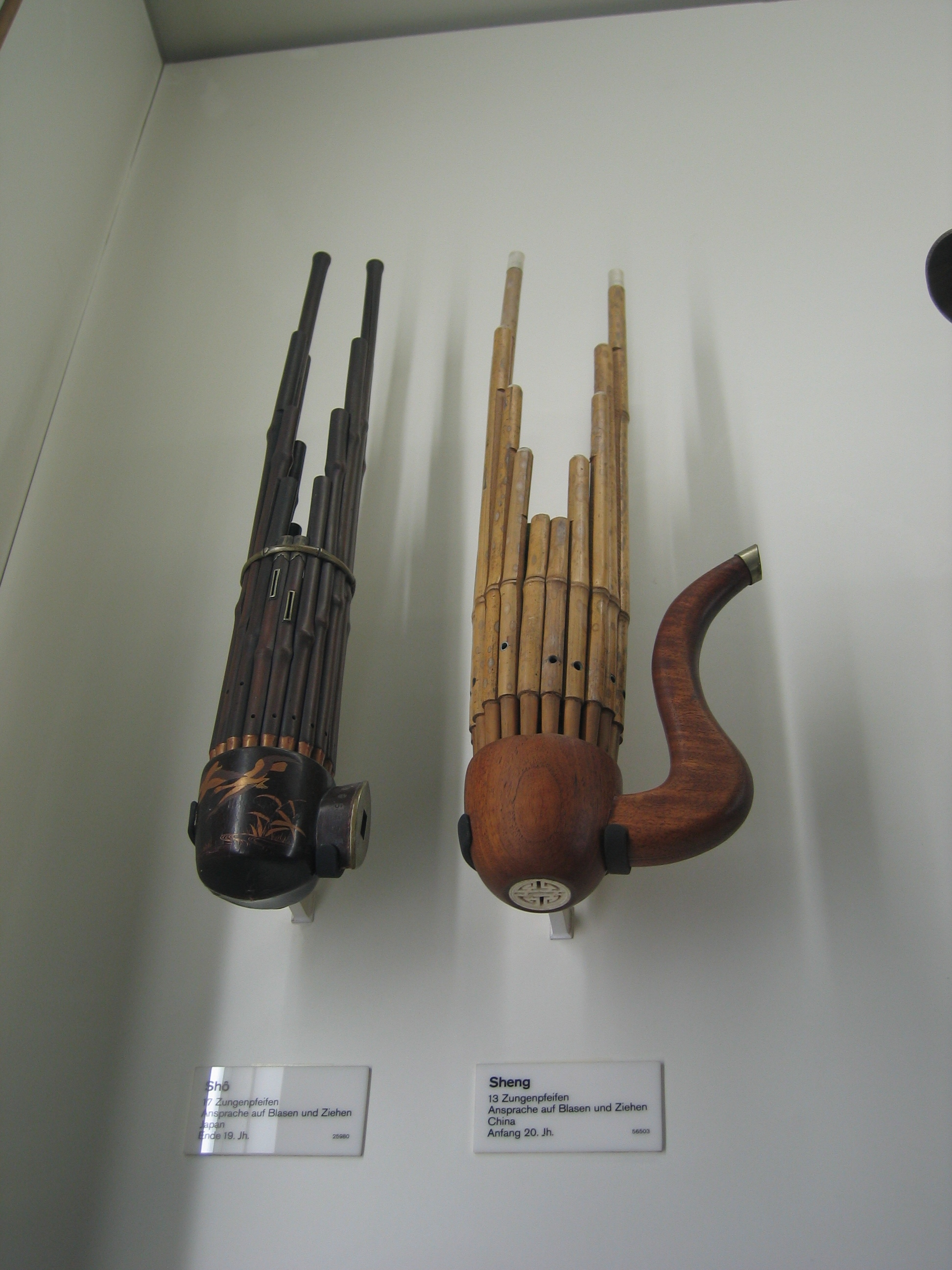
Sheng mouth organ, China

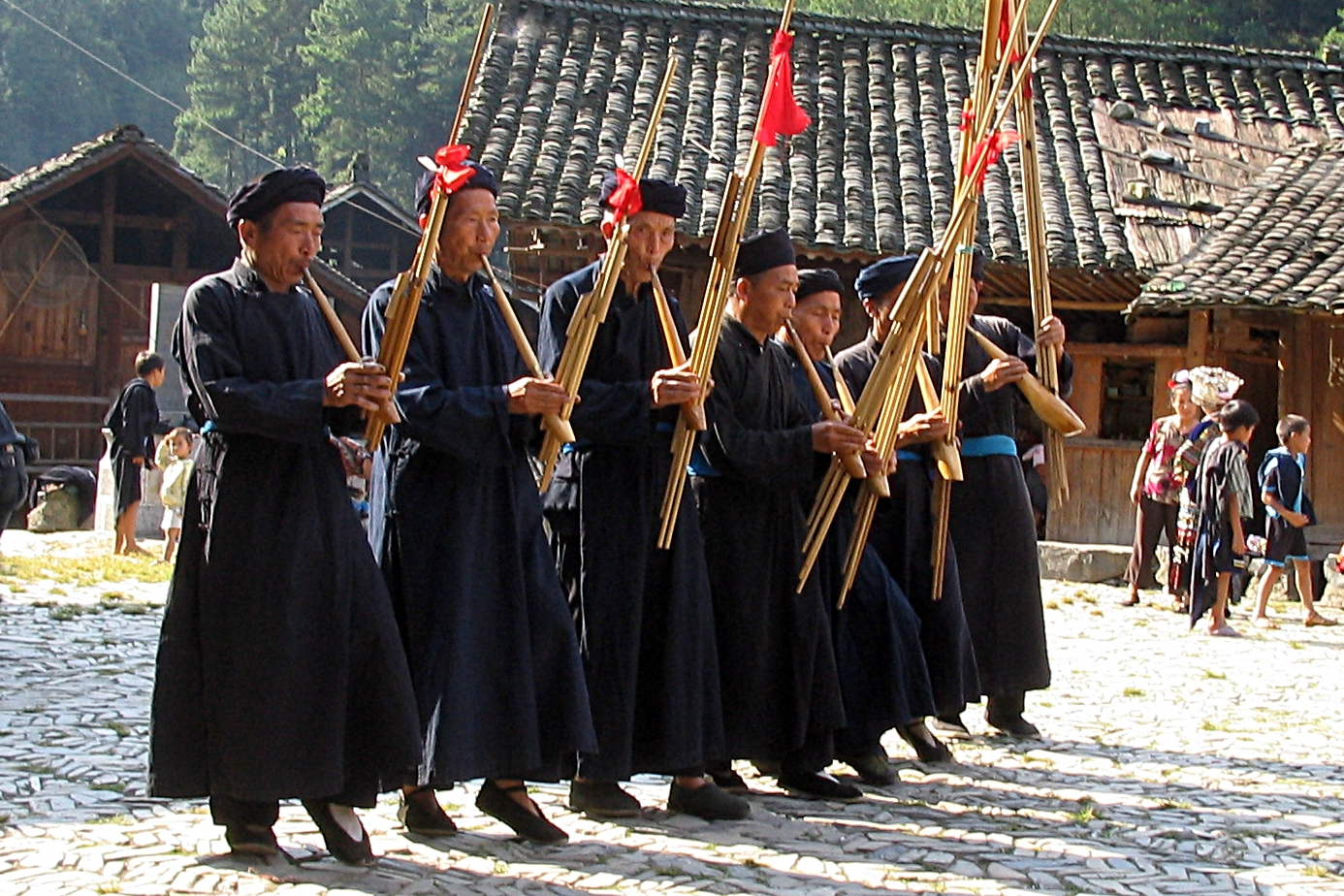
Lusheng mouth organ

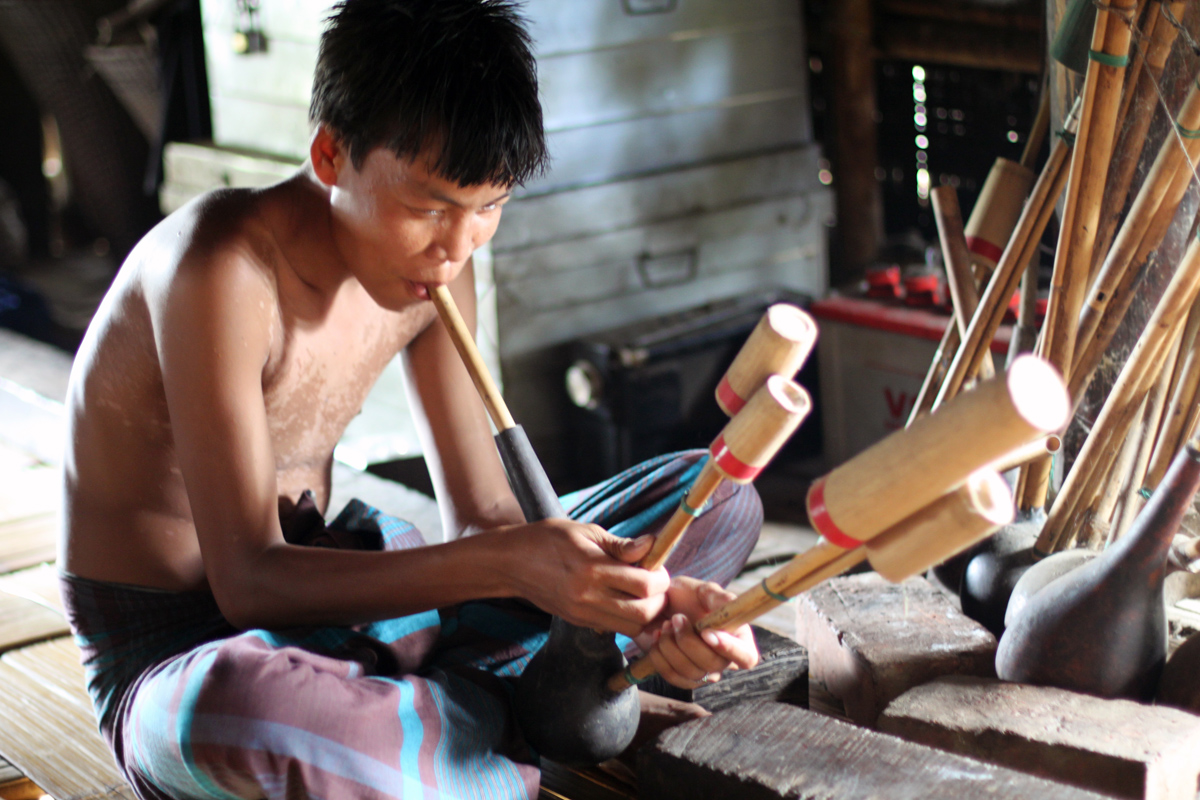
Ploong, a musical instrument of the Mru people, Bangladesh

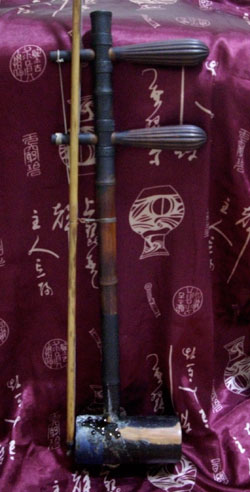
Jinghu, Chinese bowed string instrument

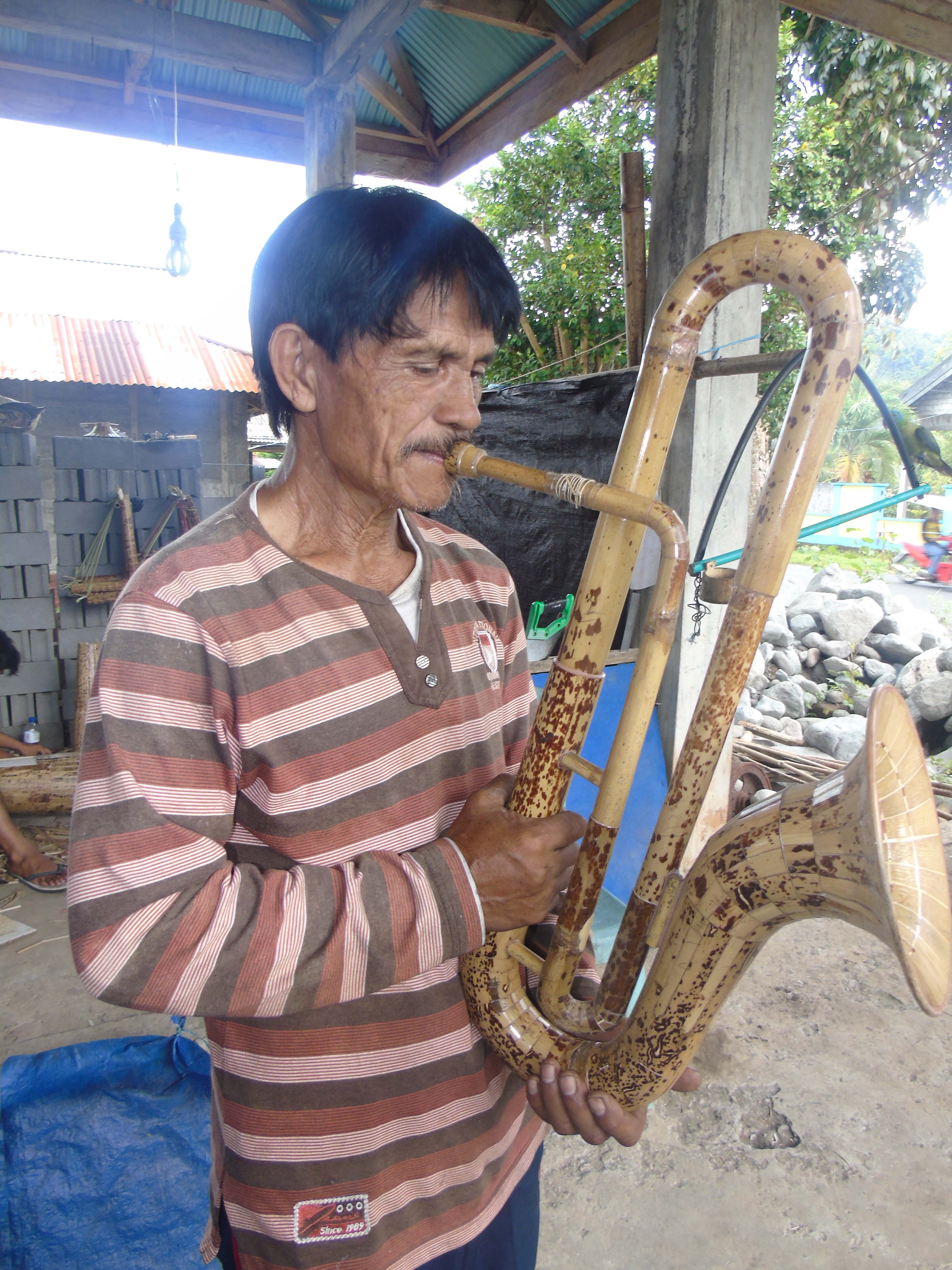
Musician Agustinus Sasundu of Sangihe, with a bamboo wind instrument
