= Shinto music =

Shinto music is the ceremonial and festive music of Shinto (神道), the indigenous religion of Japan. Its origin myth is the erotic dance of Ame-no-Uzume-no-Mikoto which lured Amaterasu from her cave.

== Kagura ==
Kagura performed by miko at the Hachiman shrine in Tamba, Hyōgo Prefecture

Kagura (神楽) or 'entertainment of the gods' includes music, dance and poetry and comprises mi-kagura of the court, o-kagura of major shrines such as Ise Jingū, and village sato-kagura.

== Forms ==
The repertoire includes eight forms that may be traced back to the eighth century: kagura-uta (kagura songs), azuma asobi (eastern entertainment), kume-uta (palace guard songs) ō-uta (big songs), onaibi-uta (night duty songs), ruika (funeral songs), ta-uta (field songs), and yamato-uta (Yamato songs).

== Instruments ==
Instruments include the wagon (和琴), kagura-bue (神楽笛), hichiriki (篳篥), suzu (鈴), tsuzumi (鼓), and shakubyōshi (笏拍子) clappers. In local festivals the kane (鉦), binzasara (編木), and taiko (太鼓) may also be found.

== See also ==
- Dengaku
- Gagaku
- Kagura
- Matsuri
- Traditional Japanese musical instruments
