= Gagaku =

Japanese music genre

Gagaku (雅楽, lit. "elegant music") is a type of Japanese classical music that was historically used for imperial court music and dances. Gagaku was developed as court music of the Kyoto Imperial Palace, and its near-current form was established in the Heian period (794–1185) around the 10th century. Today, it is performed by the Board of Ceremonies in the Tokyo Imperial Palace. Gagaku is performed using wind, percussion, and string instruments. Each piece is based on a main melody which each instrument embellishes.

Gagaku consists of three primary repertoires:

1. Native Shinto religious music and imperial songs and dance, called Kuniburi no utamai (国風歌舞)
2. Vocal music based on native folk poetry, called Utaimono (謡物)
3. Songs and dance based on foreign-style music
  1. A Chinese, Vietnamese and Indian form (specifically Tang dynasty), called Tōgaku (唐楽)
  2. A Korean and Manchurian form, called komagaku (高麗楽)

Gagaku, like shōmyō, employs the yo scale, a pentatonic scale with ascending intervals of two, three, two, two, and three semitones between the five scale tones. Artistically it differs from the music of the corresponding Chinese form yayue (雅楽) which is a term reserved for ceremonial music.

== Etymology ==
The term gagaku originated in Japan in the year 701 when the Gagaku-ryō, a government bureau which oversaw music education and performance in the Japanese Imperial Court, was established. The word gagaku comes from the Chinese word yayue, originally meaning Confucian ritual music. Gagaku is the Japanese reading for yayue, but by the time the word was introduced in Japan, its meaning had changed to be Chinese popular music and foreign music. Because gagaku was built on elements from foreign music, the Japanese application of the term gagaku to this repertoire aligned with how the word was being used in China at the time.

== History ==
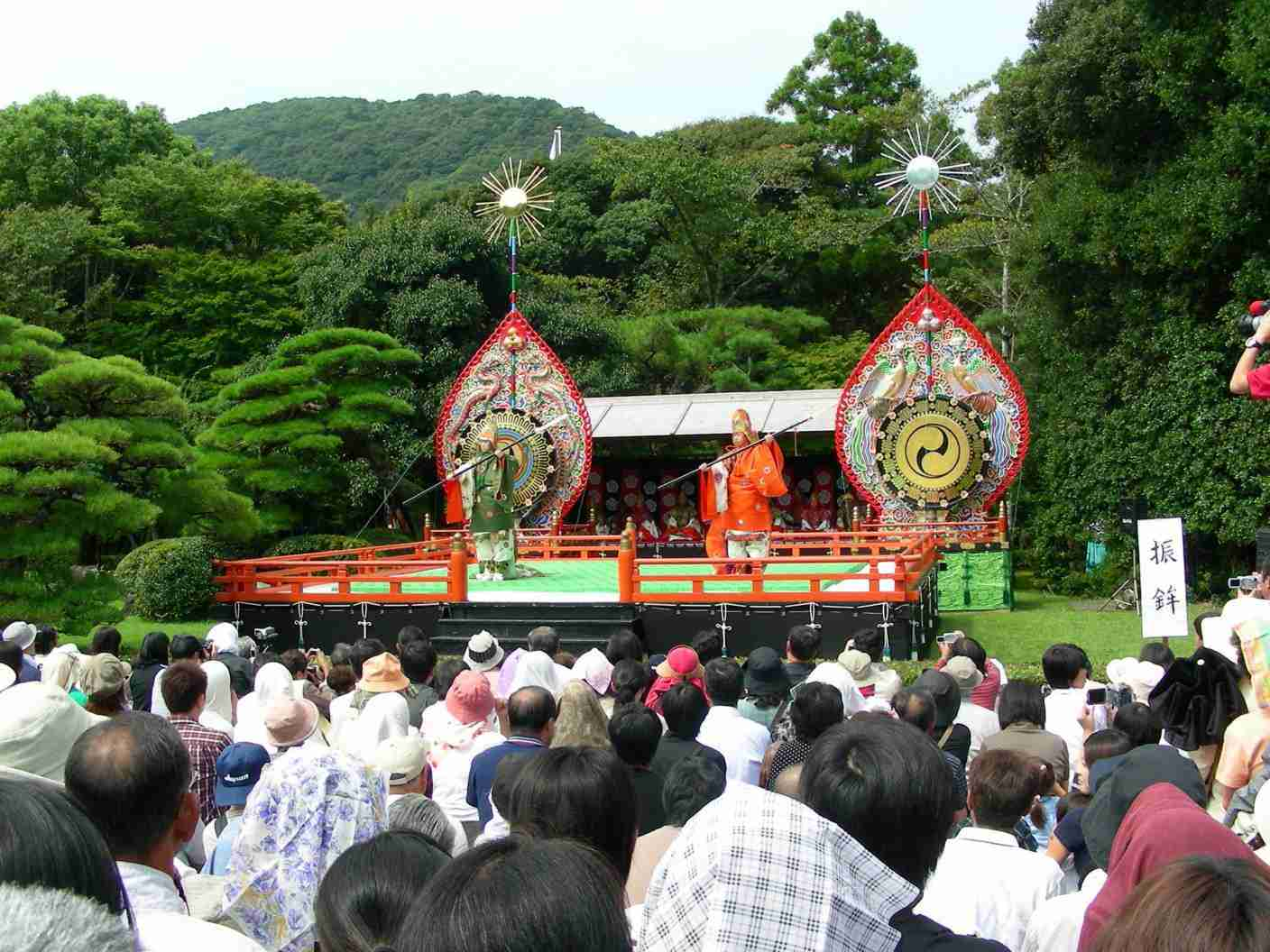
Jingu-Bugaku at Kotaijingu (Naiku), Ise city, Mie Prefecture

The prototype of gagaku was introduced into Japan with Buddhism from China. In 589, Japanese official diplomatic delegations were sent to China (during the Sui dynasty) to learn Chinese culture, including Chinese court music. By the 7th century, the koto (the 13-stringed zither) and the biwa (a short-necked lute) had been introduced into Japan from China. Various instruments, including these two, were the earliest used to play gagaku.

Even though the Japanese use the same term, 雅楽 (yǎyuè in Mandarin Chinese), the form of music imported from China was primarily banquet music (engaku) rather than the ceremonial music of the Chinese yǎyuè. The importation of music peaked during the Tang dynasty, and these pieces are called Tōgaku (Tang music). Gagaku pieces that originated at a time earlier than the Tang dynasty are called kogaku (ancient music), while those originating after the Tang dynasty are called shingaku (new music). The term gagaku itself was first recorded in 701, when the first imperial academy of music Gagakuryō was established.

Music from the Korean kingdom of Goguryeo had been recorded as early as 453 AD, and komagaku was eventually used as a term that covered all Korean pieces, the Goguryeo kingdom being referred to as Koma in Japanese. Komagaku and Tōgaku became established in southern Japan during the Nara period (710–794). In 736, music from India and Vietnam were also introduced, known as Tenjikugaku (天竺楽) and Rinyūgaku (林邑楽) respectively.

During the Nara period in the 8th century, gagaku was performed at national events, such as the erection of the Great Buddha of Todai-ji Temple, by organizing gagaku performance groups at large temples.

From the 9th century to the 10th century, during the Heian period, traditional gagaku was developed further, becoming distinctly Japanese in style through its fusion with musical styles indigenous to Japan, changing it greatly. The form of gagaku was almost completed by the fusion of Tōgaku, Komagaku, Tenjikugaku and Rinyūgaku which were introduced from Asian countries, with Kuniburi no utamai, traditional Japanese music, and utaimono, songs born in the Heian period. During this period, many pieces of gagaku music were created and foreign-style gagaku music was rearranged and renewed. Gagaku was also reorganized, and foreign-style gagaku music was classified into categories called Sahō (左方, left side) and Uhō (右方, right side). Chinese, Vietnamese and Indian style was classified as Sahō, and Korean and Manchurian style was classified as Uhō. Tenjikugaku and Rinyūgaku were also included in the category of Tōgaku.

The popularity of gagaku reached its peak between the 9th and 10th centuries, when court aristocracy began to hold private concerts, but declined in the Kamakura period (1185–1333) when the power of the court aristocracy became diminished while that of the samurai rose. Gagaku was played by musicians who belonged to hereditary guilds. During the Kamakura period, military rule was imposed and gagaku was rarely performed at court. At this time, there were three guilds, based in Osaka, Nara and Kyoto.

Due to the Ōnin War, a civil war from 1467 to 1477 during the Muromachi period, gagaku ensembles ceased to perform in Kyoto for about 100 years. In the Edo period, the Tokugawa shogunate revived and reorganized the court-style ensembles, the direct ancestors of the present gagaku ensembles.

After the Meiji Restoration of 1868, musicians from all three guilds came to the capital and their descendants make up most of the current Tokyo Imperial Palace Music Department. By that time, the present ensemble composition had been established, consisting of three wind instruments – hichiriki, ryūteki, and shō (bamboo mouth organ used to provide harmony) – and three percussion instruments – kakko (small drum), shōko (metal percussion), and taiko (drum) or dadaiko (large drum), supplemented by two string instruments – gakubiwa and gakusō.

Gagaku also accompanies classical dance performances called bugaku (舞楽). It may be used in religious ceremonies in some Buddhist temples.

In 1955, the Japanese government recognized gagaku and bugaku as important National Treasures.

Today, gagaku is performed in three ways:

- as kangen, concert music for winds, strings and percussion,
- as bugaku, or dance music, for which the stringed instruments are omitted.
- as kayō, singing and chanting poetry to the accompaniment of a musical instrument, classified into 10 categories.

Komagaku survives only as bugaku.

Contemporary gagaku ensembles, such as Reigakusha (伶楽舎), perform contemporary compositions for gagaku instruments. This subgenre of contemporary works for gagaku instruments, which began in the 1960s, is called reigaku (伶楽). 20th-century composers such as Tōru Takemitsu have composed works for gagaku ensembles, as well as individual gagaku instruments. In January 2015 the Reigakusha gagaku Ensemble and Ensemble Modern performed together Music with silent aitake's by Belgian composer Frederic D'Haene, making gagaku and Western music co-exist.

== Forms of performance ==
Two of the main ways that gagaku is performed are kangen (concert music) and bugaku (dance music). Kangen is performed using wind, string and percussion instruments while bugaku usually does not include strings.

Gagaku can be classified into two categories. Tōgaku, or "music from the left", includes music brought over from China and Southeast Asia. Komagaku, or "music from the right", includes music brought over from Korea and Bohai. In tōgaku, pieces are further classified into categories based on size. Taikyoku, chūkyokū, and shōkyoku are large, medium, and small pieces respectively. All komogaku pieces are dance pieces and therefore do not include strings.

== Instruments used ==
Wind, string and percussion instruments are essential elements of gagaku music. Some instruments, such as Haishō, Gogen biwa, Kugo had been removed from the ensemble during Heian period and reconstructed based on the old documents and some remains of the instruments in the Shōsō-in during Showa Era.

=== Wind ===
- Azuma-asobi-bue (東遊笛), also called chukan
- Haishō (排簫), panpipes
- Hichiriki (篳篥), oboe
- Kagurabue (神楽笛), transverse flute larger than ryūteki, used in kuniburi no utamai
- Komabue (高麗笛), transverse flute smaller than ryūteki, used in komagaku
- O-hichiriki (大篳篥)
- Ryūteki (龍笛), transverse flute used in tōgaku
- (Ancient) Shakuhachi (尺八)
- Shō (笙), mouth organ
- U (竽), large mouth organ

=== String ===
- Gaku Biwa (楽琵琶), 4-stringed lute
- Gakusō (楽箏), 13-string zither of Chinese origin
- Genkan (阮咸)
- Gogen biwa (五絃琵琶), 5-stringed lute
- Kugo (箜篌), angled harp used in ancient times and recently revived
- Yamatogoto (大和琴; also called wa-gon), zither of Japanese origin, with 6 or 7 strings

=== Percussion ===
- Da-daiko (鼉太鼓), large drums used at festivals
- Hōkyō (方響)
- Ikko (一鼓), small, ornately decorated hourglass-shaped drum
- Kakko (鞨鼓/羯鼓), small hourglass-shaped drum struck with two wooden sticks
- San-no-tsuzumi (三の鼓), hourglass-shaped drum
- Shakubyoshi (笏拍子; also called shaku), clapper made from a pair of flat wooden sticks
- Shōko (鉦鼓), small gong, struck with two horn beaters
- Suzu (鈴), a bell tree clapper, specific to Mikomai dance performed as Mi-kagura
- Tsuri-daiko (釣太鼓), drum on a stand with ornately painted head, played with two padded sticks
- Tsuzumi (鼓), hourglass drum, specific to Shirabyōshi dance performed as Mi-kagura

== Form ==
The basis of a gagaku piece is one melody which is interpreted by all members of the ensemble at the same time on their respective instruments. It is not played with sheet music but from memory, so it is not exact and it remains fluid as each musician remains perfectly in sync with one another. Each instrument adds its own touch, which makes gagaku music sound unique. This melody is always the main focus, and one of the distinguishing features of gagaku music is that each of the eight instruments plays a distinct version of the melody that is their own. These eight instruments may vary depending on the type of gagaku, but having eight different parts is typical of gagaku music. In some gagaku ensembles, parts are doubled so there may be more than eight players, but there are always only eight distinct parts.

The roles of each instrument within this form are as follows:

- Three wind instruments play the main melody as the most prominent voices in the ensemble.
  - Hichiriki (similar to an oboe with a larger reed) is the main melody voice and embellishes the melody with microtones made possible by the larger reed.
  - Fue (horizontal flute) uses its higher range to play a variation on the melody.
  - Sho (bamboo pipe mouth organ) plays simplified version of the main melody and colors it with five and six tone harmonies.
- Two string instruments play simplified versions of the main melody.
  - Biwa (four strings) plays both single tones and four voice chords.
  - Koto (thirteen strings) plays repetitive melodic patterns.
- Three percussion instruments provide an anchor point for the rhythm and emphasize the phrasing of the melody.
  - Taiko (suspended drum) plays the primary accent in each phrase.
  - Kakko (small braced drum) is the leader of the entire ensemble and controls tempo changes.
  - Shoko (gong) provides rhythmic support.

== Influence on Western music ==
Beginning in the 20th century, several western classical composers became interested in gagaku, and composed works based on gagaku. Most notable among these are Henry Cowell (Ongaku, 1957), La Monte Young (numerous works of drone music, but especially Trio for Strings, 1958), Alan Hovhaness (numerous works), Olivier Messiaen (Sept haïkaï, 1962), Lou Harrison (Pacifika Rondo, 1963), Benjamin Britten (Curlew River, 1964), Bengt Hambraeus (Shogaku, from Tre Pezzi per Organo, 1967), Ákos Nagy (Veiled wince flute quartet 2010), Jarosław Kapuściński (numerous works), Sarah Peebles (numerous works), Michiko Toyama (Waka, 1960), and Tim Hecker (Konoyo and Anoyo, 2018 and 2019 respectively).

One of the most important gagaku musicians of the 20th century, Masatarō Tōgi (東儀 和太郎, 1910-1993), who served for many years as chief court musician, instructed American composers such as Alan Hovhaness and Richard Teitelbaum, as well as the ethnomusicologist Robert Garfias, in the playing of gagaku instruments.

== Other cultural influence ==
The American poet Steve Richmond developed a unique style based on the rhythms of gagaku. Richmond heard gagaku music on records at U.C.L.A.'s Department of Ethnomusicology in the early 1960s. In a 2009 interview with writer Ben Pleasants, Richmond claimed he had written an estimated 8,000–9,000 gagaku poems.

== See also ==
- Aak
- Etenraku
- Gigaku
- Kagura
- Nhã nhạc
- Yayue
