= Frederic D'Haene =

Belgian composers

Frederic D’haene is an avant-garde composer born in Kortrijk (Belgium) in 1961. After completing musicology at Ghent University and KU Leuven, he studied composition at Royal Conservatory of Liège with Frederic Rzewski, Walter Zimmermann, Henri Pousseur and Vinko Globokar. He later worked as assistant of Frederic Rzewski at the Conservatory of Liège (1990–96). He was introduced to Gagaku Music through Tadatoshi Miyagawa and Kanehiko Togi (former head of Kunai-cho Gakubu; the Music Department of the Imperial Household Agency). His own composition technique is called ‘paradoxophony’.

== Collaborations ==
- Conductors: James Wood, Mark Foster, Michael Wendeberg, Robin Engelen, Kasper de Roo.
- Performers: Ensemble Modern, Ensemble Contrechamps, Danel Quartet, Champ d’Action, Het Collectief, Geoffrey Madge, Frederic Rzewski, Armand Angster, Jean-Pierre Peuvion, Daan Vandewalle, Marianne Schroeder, Claude Coppens, Wibert Aerts, David Cohen, Wim Konink, Takao Hyakutome.
- Concert halls & festivals: deSingel (BE), Ars Musica Festival (BE), Transitfestival (BE), Blackheath Halls (UK), Edmonton New Music Festival (CA), The Music Gallery in Toronto (CA), Gesellschaft für akustische Lebenshilfe (DE), Studio Ernest-Ansermet, Genève (CH), Watanabe Jun-ichi Bungakukan, Sapporo (JP), Frankfurter Positionen festival (DE).

== List of Compositions ==
Frederic D'Haene writes mainly commissioned work: Orchestral and chamber music, pieces for solo instruments and vocal music.

- 2016: (in progress) Resist to exist opera for 4 singers, 2 rappers and chamber orchestra. With texts by Mahmoud Darwish, Dietrich Bonhoeffer, Albert Camus, Sade and Palestinian solidarity campaigners.
- 2011 - 2012 Fluxus-static friction for flute, clarinet, violin, cello and piano
- 2009 (in progress) Concerto for cello and chamber orchestra
- 2010 - 2011 Hearing from nowhere - part three for flute, bass clarinet, violin, viola, cello, percussion and piano
- 2008 Zen et Révolte for solo violin
- 2007 Voiding Streams for piano solo
- 2003 - 2006 Music with Silent Aitake's for Gagaku and chamber orchestra. CD with Reigakusha Gagaku Ensemble (Japan) and Ensemble Modern (Germany), conductor Kasper De Roo (Ravello Records).
- 2001 Désert axiomatique for percussion and string quartet
- 2000 Hearing from Nowhere-part two for flute, bass clarinet, violin, cello, percussion and piano
- 1998 - 1999 Poet of Liberty for soprano, flute, cello, piano and percussion obligate
- 1998 MusicAnarchy I- to breathe that void for solo voice (score)
- 1997 – 1998 Dissociations centromériques for piano, percussion and chamber orchestra
- 1995 Scorci del Mocciolo for rock combo and symphony orchestra
- 1994 Hearing from Nowhere-part one for flute, bass clarinet, viola, cello, percussion and piano
- 1993 Inert Reacting Substance for chamber orchestra
- 1993 A-centroid for string quartet
- 1992 Objets retrouvés pour la collectivité for two trombones
- 1992 Wozu Dichter - Millimètres for soprano, flute, cello, piano and percussion obligate
- 1992 The peaks were... The Valleys came in-Musik für Lara for piano solo
- 1992 Brief an kandinsky for bass clarinet solo
- 1992 (in progress) Trilogyfragments: great cycle of seven works, in which four of the above compositions will be included
- 1991 Sans identité for bass clarinet quartet
- 1991 Pessoa Revisited for flute, cello and piano
- 1991 For declining Times for piano solo
- 1998 Allelujàssemblage for choir a cappella (score)
- 1990 Ohne Titel mit Text for soprano, piano, strings and tape
- 1991 Stagework Tirannie der hulpverlening for flute, trombone, harp, percussion and two actors
- 1989 Communio for two pianos

== Bibliography ==
- LEVAUX, T., Frederic D’Haene in Dictionnaire des compositeurs de Belgique du Moyen Age à nos jours, Editions ART IN BELGIUM, ISBN 2-930338-37-7, p. 402-403, 2004
- KNOCKAERT, Y., FREDERIC D'HAENE - SONORE METAFOREN, Kunst & Cultuur, Oct 1993, reeks Vlaamse componisten aflevering 13 (in Dutch)
- KNOCKAERT, Y., Nieuwe Muziek in Vlaanderen, p. 156-158 (chapter De Postmodernisten), 1998
- BUCKINX, B., De kleine Pomo of de muziekgeschiedenis van het postmodernisme, Peer, 1994

== Discography ==
- 2001 Nouvelles musiques de chambre with music by Henri Pousseur, Bernard Foccroulle, Michel Fourgon, Frederic D'Haene, Edison Denisov, Giacinto Scelsi. Cyprès, 1997.
- 2018 Music with silent aitake's by Frederic D'Haene. Reigakusha Gagaku Ensemble, Ensemble Modern, Kasper De Roo, conductor. Ravello Records, 2018.
