= Kane (instrument) =

Japanese bell

A atarigane or kane or chanchiki (当たり鉦 or 鉦 or チャンチキ) (ja:鉦鼓(en:Shōko (instrument)) or ja:摺鉦) [kane] is a type of dish-shaped bell from Japan.

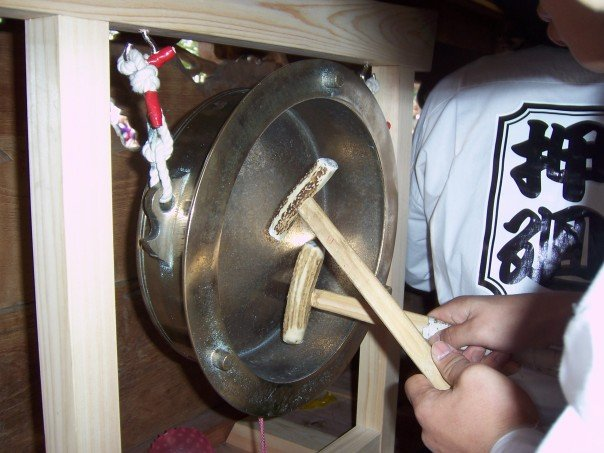

The atarigane (当たり鉦) is often found in traditional Japanese music or min'yō. Although sometimes suspended from a bar, it is more common for a musician to hold the bell in place with one hand beat it with the other using a special mallet called a shumoku (撞木) or kane yō bachi (鉦用バチ), often made from bone. The kane makes three distinct sounds: chan - hitting the middle; chi - hitting the inside edge; and ki - reversing the stroke. This kind of onomatopoeic mnemonic or Kuchi shōga is common in Japanese music. There are several sizes of kane, such as the atarigane or the surigane.

Kane are also used in Buddhist or Shinto ceremonies. In temples, they may be used to signify time or alert people to certain events.

== See also ==
- Bonshō
- Japanese bells
- Shōko (instrument)
- Suzu
