= Khakkhara =

Buddhist staff

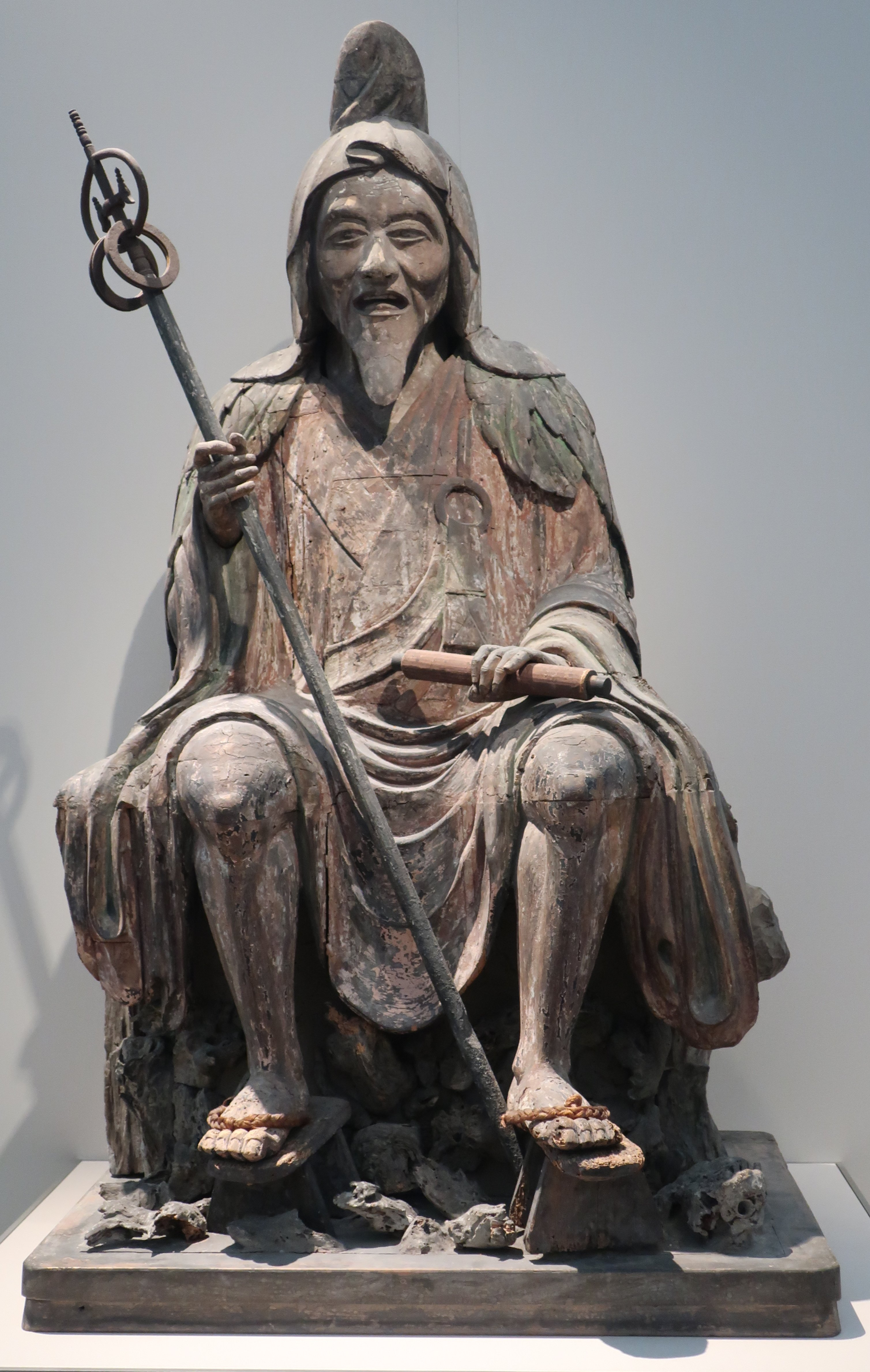
En no Gyōja holding a khakkhara, Japan, Kamakura period, polychromed wood

A khakkhara or shakujo (Sanskrit: खक्खर; Tibetan: འཁར་གསིལ, THL: khar sil; Chinese: 錫杖; pinyin: xīzhàng; Japanese: 錫杖; rōmaji: shakujō; Korean: 석장; romaja: seokjang; Vietnamese: tích trượng; lit. 'tin stick'; Khmer: ខាខារ), sometimes referred to in English as a 'pewter staff', is a staff topped with metal rings traditionally carried by Buddhist monks, particularly in East Asian Buddhism.

Originally used as a noisemaker to announce a monk's presence and frighten away animals, it was adapted for use as a rhythmic instrument during chanting and sutra recitation, and for use as a weapon. It is also known as a "tiger pewter staff" (Chinese: 虎錫; pinyin: Hǔ xī), due to its traditional use of driving away predatory animals. The earliest recorded description of a khakkhara is in the writings of the Chinese pilgrim monk Yijing who traveled between China, Indonesia, and India in the years 671 to 695 AD.

== Design ==
The basic design of a khakkhara is of a central staff, normally in wood, topped by a finial in metal, with a looped design, from which smaller metal rings hang on each side (similar to the stringing of traditional Chinese cash). Various numbers of loops and rings are employed, with each number being assigned symbolic significance on the basis of a variety of Buddhist numerical formulas. Historical examples from the Famen Temple include staffs with one, two, or four loops and four, six, or twelve rings on each loop.

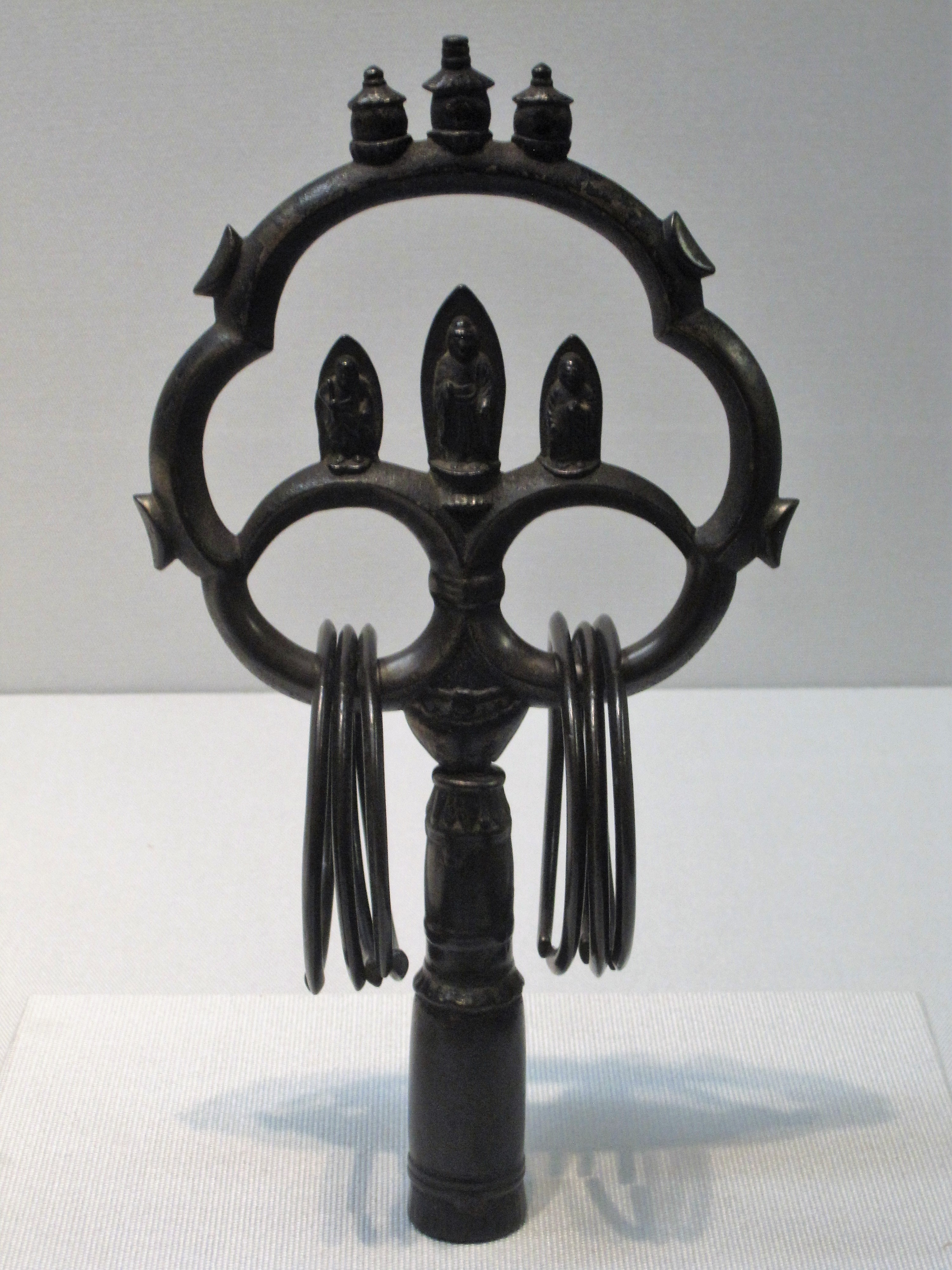
Finial made in 1142, Tesshu-ji temple, Japan

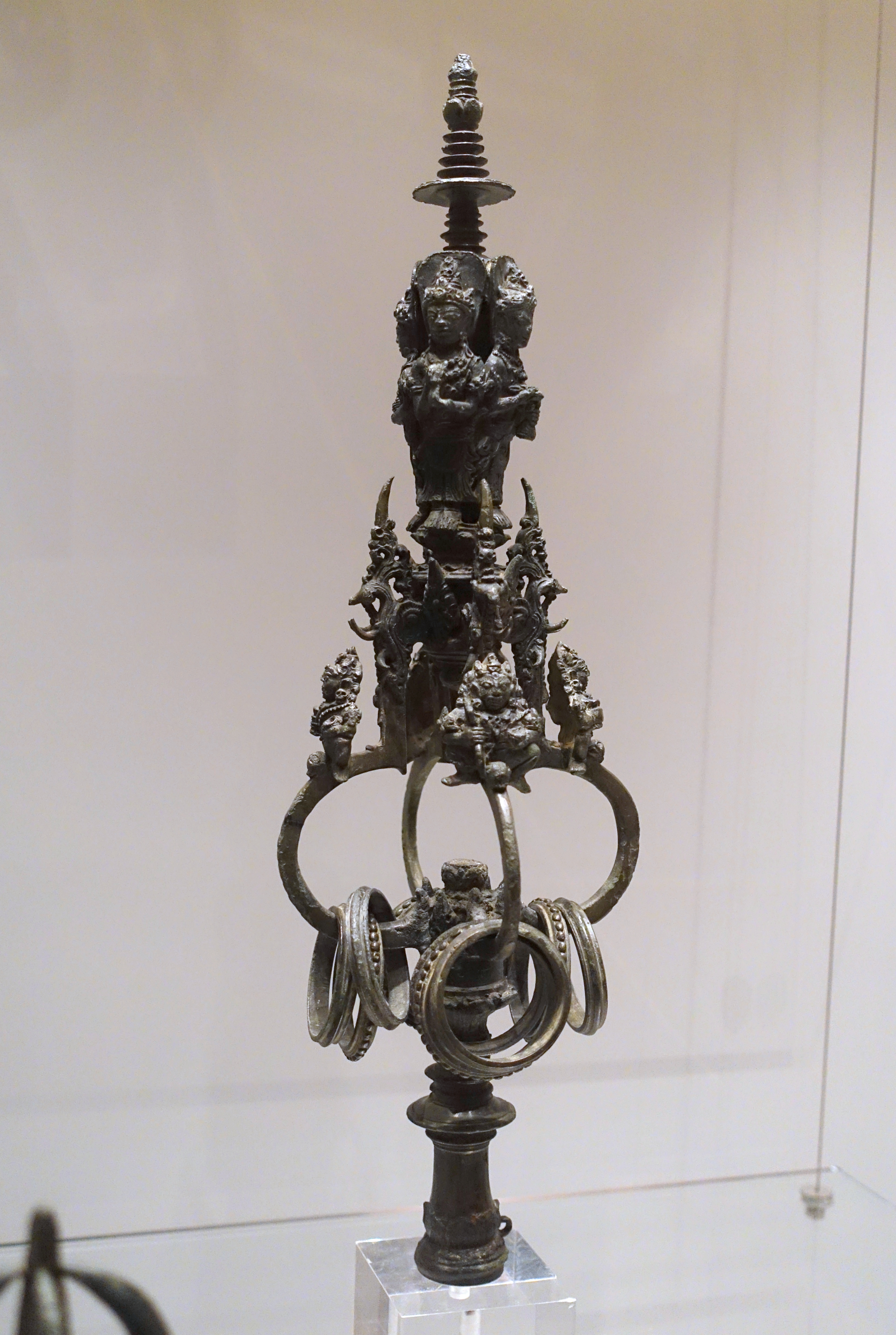
Finial of a khakkhara, Eastern Java, 12th–13th century, bronze

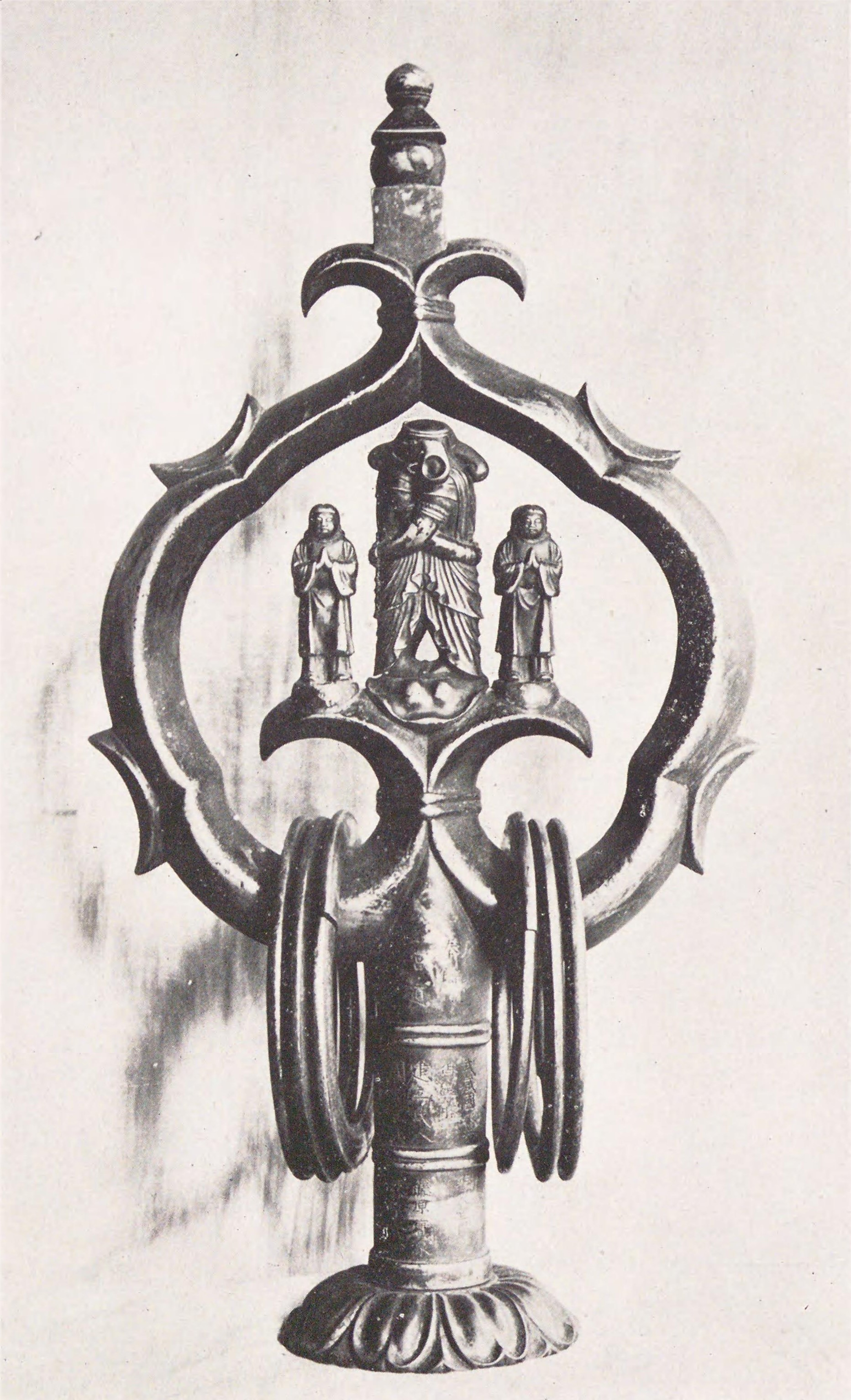
Shakujo head of Kangiin, Kumagaya, Japan

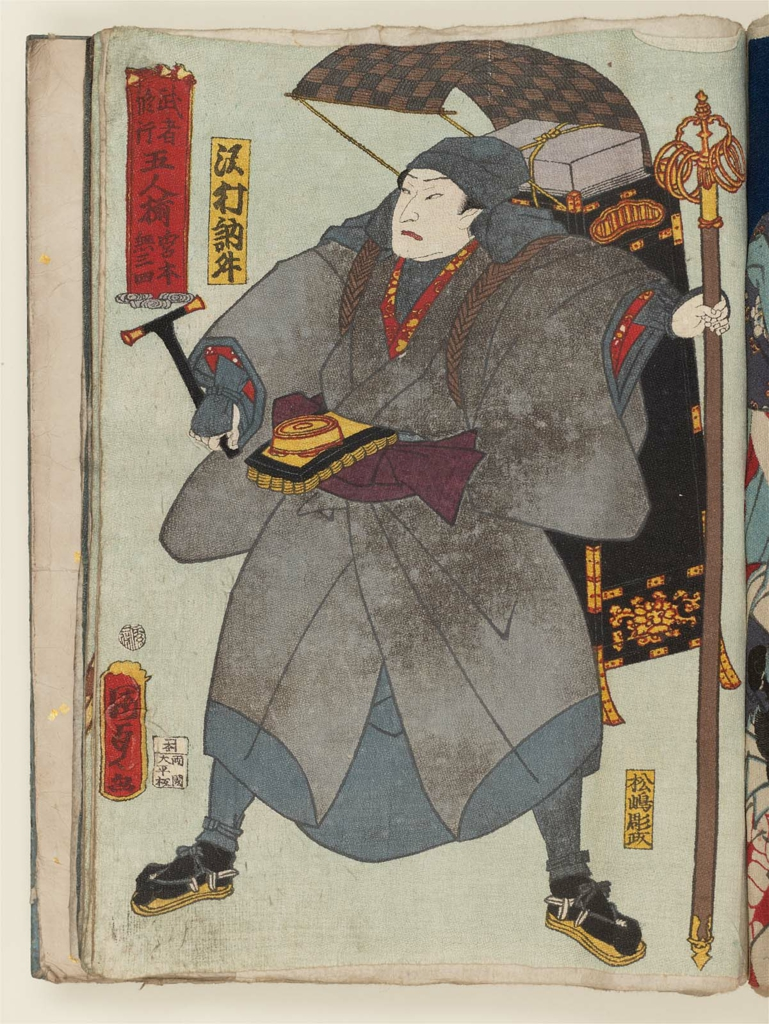
Ukiyo-e; Set of Five Warriors as Ascetic Pilgrims (Musha shugyō gonin soroe 武者修行五人揃)

== Origin ==
Several versions of the staff's origin are given in the Sarvastivada vinaya, but in all of them the staff is recommended to monks by the Buddha in order to ward off animals- either for protection from dangerous predatory animals like tigers and lions, or for scaring off small creatures like spiders and snakes that might be trodden upon by wandering monks. The ringing of the staff can also alert donors within earshot of the monk's presence, as monks traditionally remain silent while collecting alms.

In the Mahayana sutra known as the Pewter Staff Sutra (Chinese: 得道梯橙錫杖經; pinyin: Dé dào tī chéng xízhàng jīng), the Buddha instructed his monks that they should have one of these staves, because the Buddhas of the past, present and future also kept such a staff.

According to the Record of Buddhistic Kingdoms by Faxian, the capital city of Nagara once had a vihara that held the staff that belonged to the Buddha. The staff was made of "bulls-head sandalwood" (Sanskrit: gośīrṣa candana) and was about 16–17 chi in length. It was encased in a wooden sheath and too heavy for even a thousand men to move.

== Culture and symbolism ==
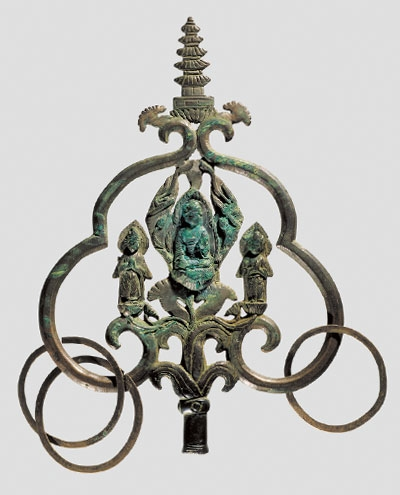
Korean finial

In Chinese monasteries, the khakkhara symbolizes the abbot's administrative authority. When ascending the platform during large ceremonies, the abbot takes the khakkhara and strikes the ground three times while shaking it, symbolizing the breaking of ignorance and calling out to all beings. In Japanese temples, the khakkhara is usually handheld, with the rattle of the khakkhara being used as a rhythmic instrument during sutra chanting to keep time, similar to the wooden fish.

The khakkhara came to symbolize monks in Chinese literature, serving as an emblem similar to the robe and bowl. A popular name for a wandering mendicant monk is "Fei Xi" (Chinese: 飛錫; pinyin: Fēi xī) (flying staff). Alternatively, a monk who dwells comfortably in a monastery may be referred to as "Gua xi" (Chinese: 掛錫; pinyin: Guà xī) (hung-up staff). A monk who belongs to a monastery but frequently travels for various religious duties may also be called a "Gua xi or a Zhuo xi (Chinese: 掛錫 or a 卓錫; pinyin: Guà xī or a Zhuō xī), indicating the laying down of his staff. 'Planting a staff' similarly refers to a monk who has taken up a long-term residence.

The number of loops and rings featured on the staff was also assigned symbolic significance, according to a variety of Buddhist numerical formulas- four loops symbolizing the Four Noble Truths, six rings representing the Six Perfections, or twelve rings representing the twelvefold chain of cause and effect.

A notable carrier of the staff is Kṣitigarbha, the bodhisattva of children and travelers. He is usually depicted holding a khakkhara in his right hand. It is also often held by images of the thousand-armed Avalokiteśvara in Chinese and Japanese statuary.

=== Folklore ===
Baiyun Mountain in Guangzhou, China features a spring known as "Pewter Staff Spring" (Chinese: 錫泉; pinyin: Xī quán). According to legend, a monk struck the earth with his staff which caused the spring to appear.

The "eye-cleansing well" (Japanese: 根洗いの井戸) at Enkōji in Kōchi Prefecture, Japan, is said to have been created by means of a khakkhara. The temple's legendary account tells that in 795, Kōbō-Daishi used his staff to break the ground and pull water in order to save the nearby village from drought.

=== Martial arts ===
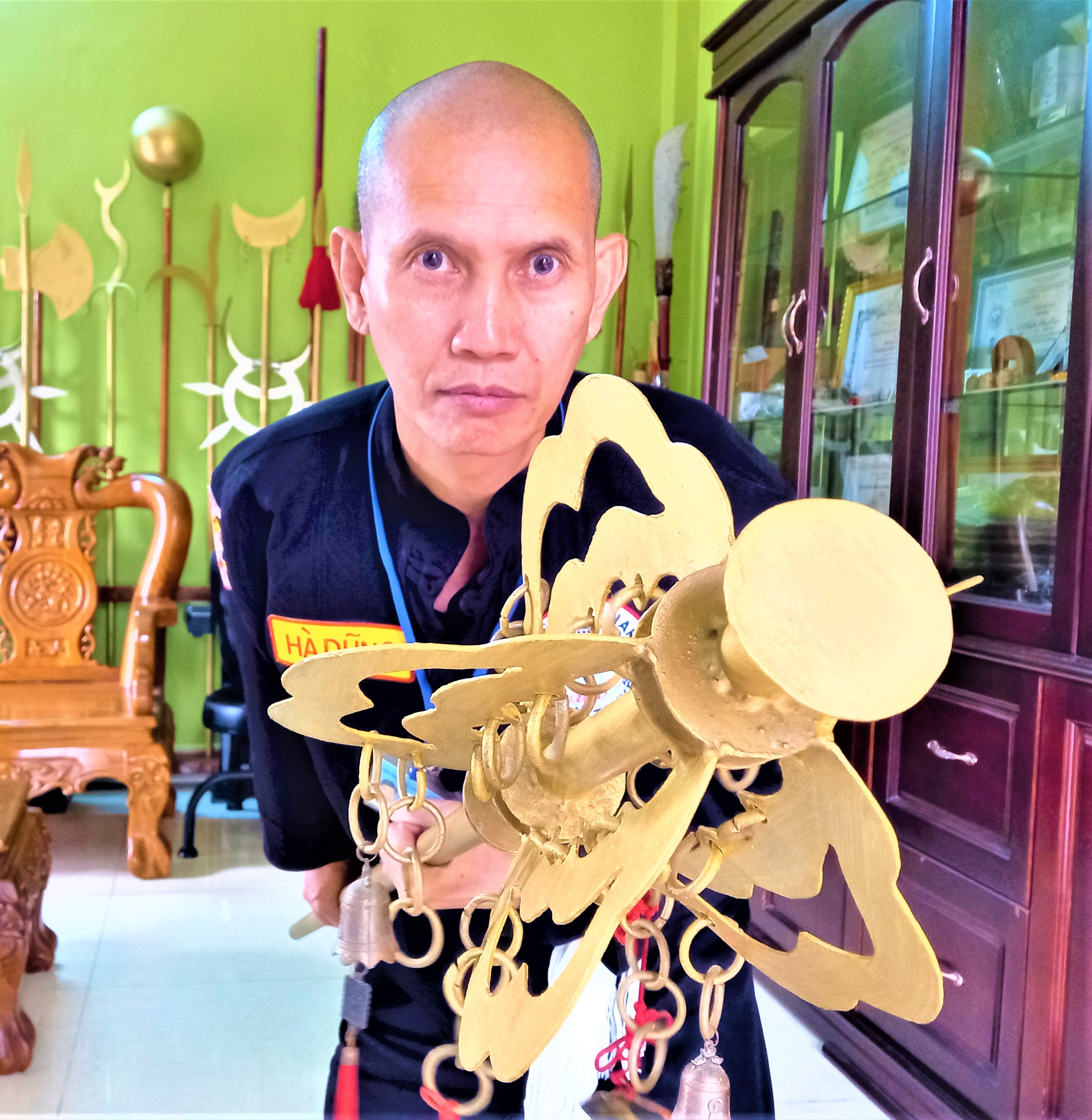
Master Hà Dũng uses Khakkhara

The wooden shaft can either be long for use as a walking stick or short for accompaniment in chanting. As a staff, the khakkhara could be wielded as a weapon; in Chinese wuxia novels the khakkhara is often the weapon of warrior monks, especially those of Shaolin Monastery. It has been used in defensive techniques by traveling Buddhist monks all over East Asia for centuries, and monks at the Shaolin temple in China specialized in its use.

In Japan, the shakujō became a formidable weapon in the hands of a practiced Buddhist monk. It could be used as a staff to block and parry attacks, and the metal rings at the tip could be slammed into an opponent's face to momentarily blind him. At the very tip of the metal finial is a sharp point which can be used to attack weak points of the body. The bottom end of the khakkhara has a metal butt which can be used to thrust and hit an opponent.

Shorinji Kempo contains methods of self-defense using the khakkhara, but these are rarely practiced today.

=== Outside Buddhism ===
Other Chinese literature makes mention of the staff in the context of filial piety. It is argued that if one's parents fall into hell, it is due to their own wickedness. How then can the Buddha's pewter staff save them? (Chinese: 豈浮屠錫杖所能救而出之者乎; pinyin: Qǐ fútú xízhàng suǒ néng jiù ér chū zhī zhě hū)?

== See also ==
- Crosier
- Kagura suzu (a Shinto hand-held bell musical instrument)
- Monk's spade
- Pilgrim's staff
- Turkish crescent
