= Kagura suzu =

Set of twelve bells used in kagura dance

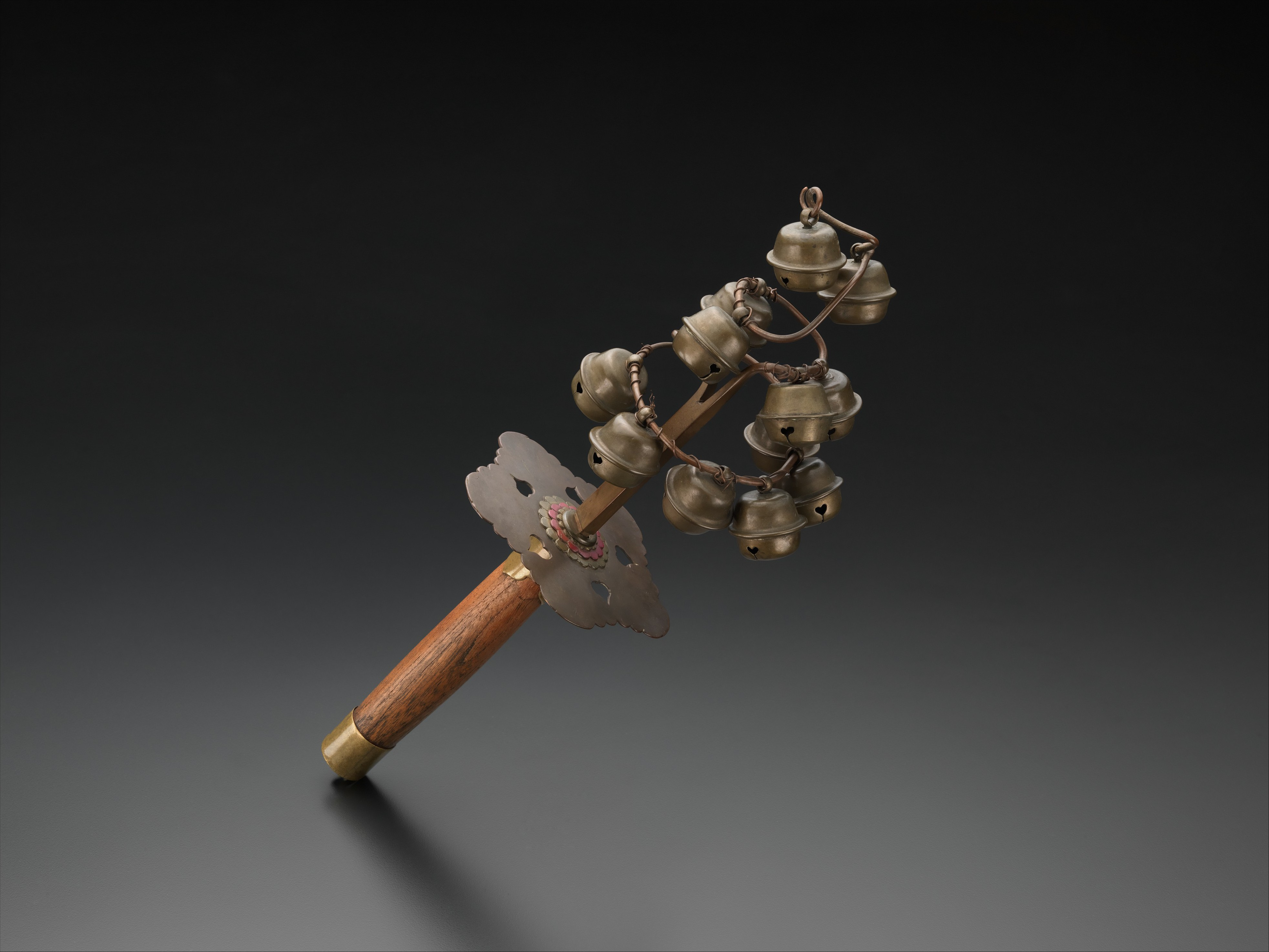
17th-century Kagura suzu from Miwa, Nara Prefecture, Japan, at the Metropolitan Museum of Art

Kagura suzu performance, 2023

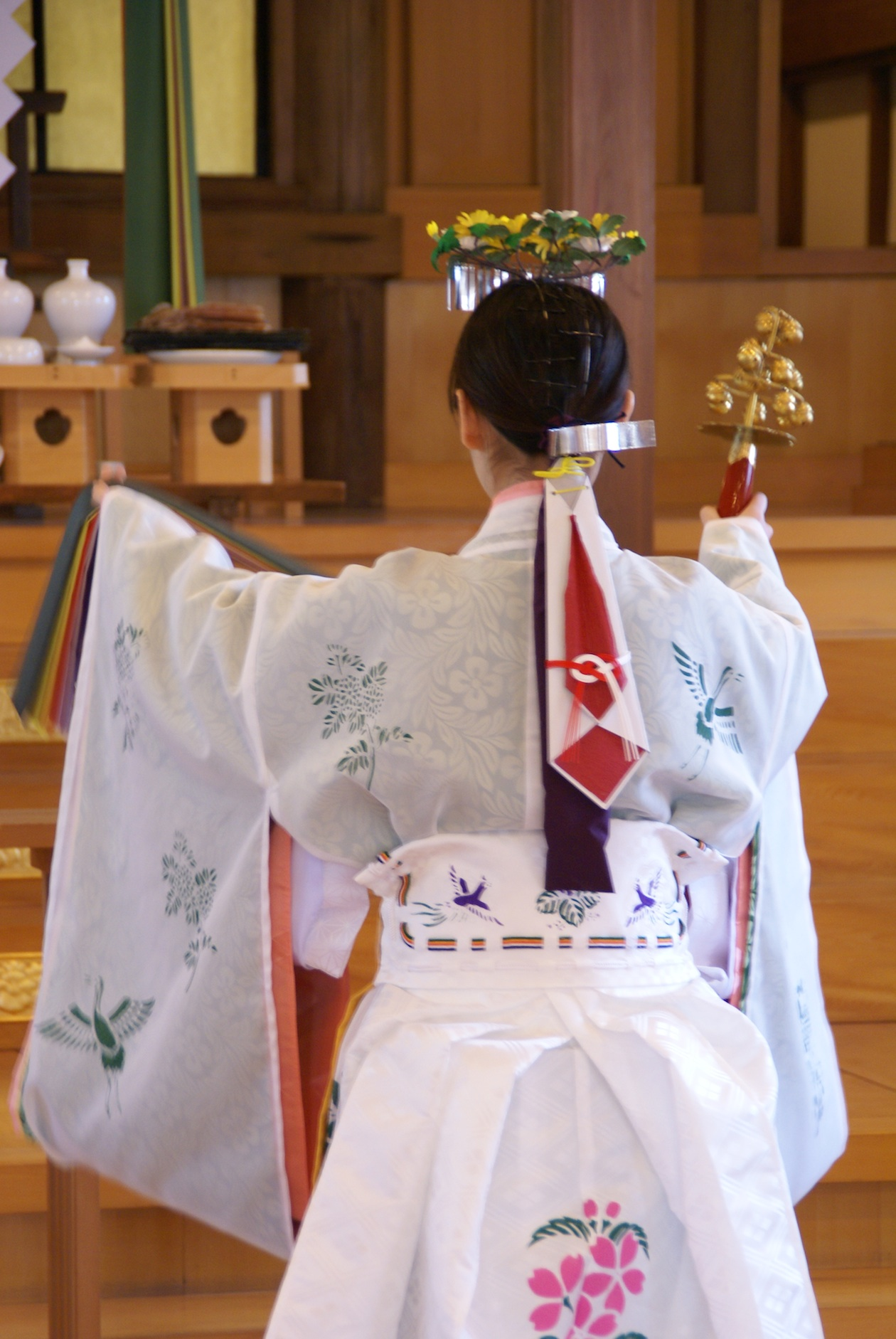
Shinto priestess with suzu bells in her right hand

Kagura suzu (神楽鈴) are a set of twelve to fifteen bells on a short staff used in kagura dance. The set consists of three tiers of bells suspended by coiled brass wires from a central handle: two bells on the top tier, four bells on the middle tier, and six bells for the bottom tier. The shape of the bells are thought to have been inspired from the fruits of the ogatama tree (Michelia compressa).

The term suzu (鈴) refers to small bells in general, but can refer to two Japanese instruments associated with Shinto ritual:

1. A single large crotal bell similar in shape to a sleigh bell and having a slit on one side.
2. A handheld bell-tree with small crotal bells strung in three levels on a spiraling wire.

The larger form may be hung from a rafter in front of a Shinto shrine and sounded by a robe or ribbons that hang within reach of the worshipper. The smaller suzu is supported atop a handle and is held by female shrine attendants (miko) costumed in traditional robes, white-powdered faces, and wearing Heian-period coiffure during performances of Kagura dances. The small bells may also be grouped together in bundles for folk and ceremonial performances.

The term "Kagura (神楽, lit. 'god-entertainment')", translated roughly as "god music", is the general term for all of the music and dance rituals associated with Japanese Shinto. Developed from rural folk traditions, kagura became an important part of Japanese imperial tradition and is now recognized as one of the country's most important artistic traditions. The term was formalized as early as 773 CE, when it appeared in the palace repertoire.

== Related mythology ==
Amenouzume, in Japanese mythology, the celestial goddess who performed a spontaneous dance enticing the sun goddess Amaterasu out of the cave in which she had secluded herself and had thus deprived the world of light.

Amenouzume decorated herself with club moss and leaves of the sakaki tree, lit bonfires, and made a platform of an upturned tub. Her inspired cries and divine dancing, in the course of which she exposed herself, so delighted the assembled gods that they roared in laughter, thus awakening the curiosity of the sun goddess.

Amenouzume taking the sakaki branch in her hand during the dance is said to be the original, ancient form of the suzu bells that are now used in Kagura.

Ame no Uzume by Taki Katei (1866)

Amenouzume is the patron goddess of dancers. The classical music and dancing used in Shinto religious ceremonies, kagura, is said to have originated with her performance. In popular mythology, as the embodiment of the female principle, she is often associated with Sarutahiko Ōkami, who represents male sexuality and who offered himself as a guide to the divine grandchild Ninigi-no-Mikoto when he descended to earth. Amenouzume and Sarutahiko are sometimes pictured as husband and wife. Kagura, Kagura suzu, and miko are all deeply connected to Amenouzume, which is why they are often used in ceremony at her shrines dedicated to her, or shrines that enshrine her as a secondary goddess.

== Popular culture ==
Shinto intermingles freely with the cultures of Japan, including the popular culture, featuring the most important myths and concepts mostly implicitly but sometimes explicitly. The following are some examples of modern video game elements inspired by miko culture and the kagura suzu:

- In 2020 action role-playing game Genshin Impact produced by miHoYo (HoYoverse), there is a weapon named Kagura's Verity, inspired by the appearance of Kagura suzu. The weapon is the signature weapon of a miko motif character named Yae Miko.
- In 2025 survival horror game Silent Hill f developed by NeoBards Entertainment and published by Konami Digital Entertainment, one of the bosses, The Sakuko-Like Entity, holds a Kagura suzu-like weapon with spikes. The weapon makes ringing sound when shaken just like the Kagura suzu.

== Gallery ==
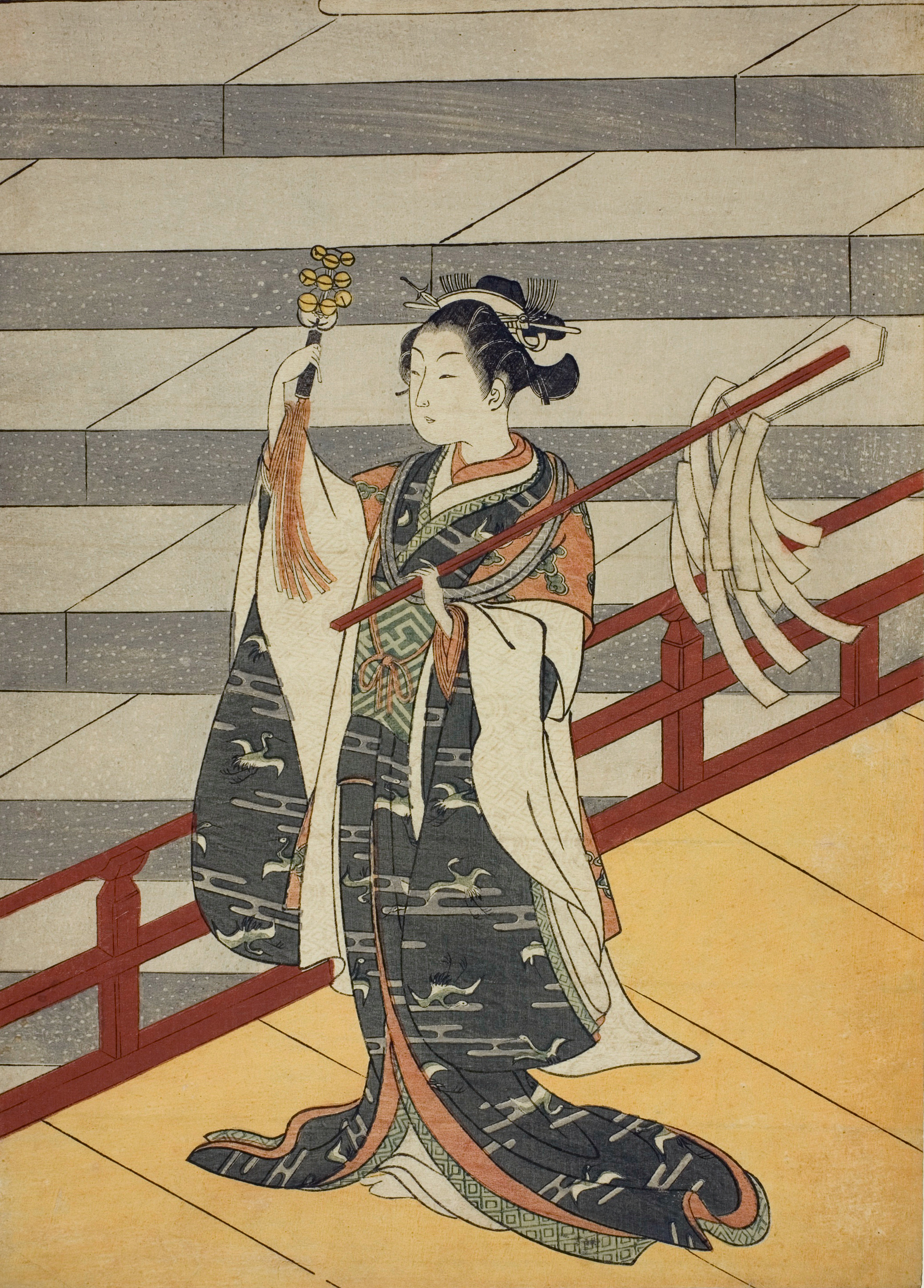
The Kagura Dancer, showing a dancer with kagura suzu. By Suzuki Harunobu, circa 1766.

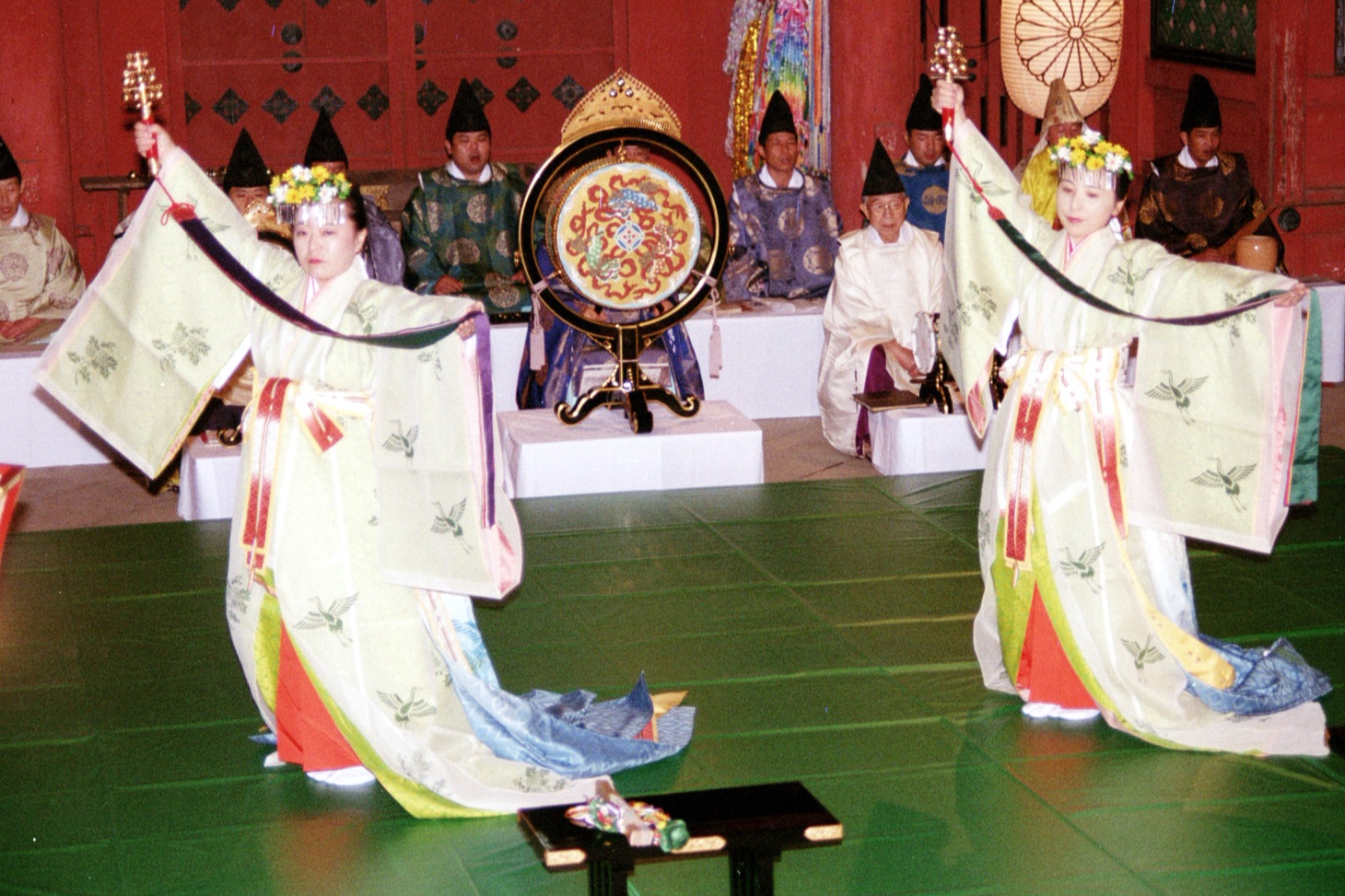
Two miko perform with kagura suzu.

== See also ==
- Bonshō
- Dōtaku
- Glossary of Shinto
- Rin
- Shakujō (a Buddhist rattle staff)
- Sistrum (Ancient Egyptian)
- Suzu
- Trīdeksnis (Latvian)
