= Shōko (instrument) =

Japanese musical instrument

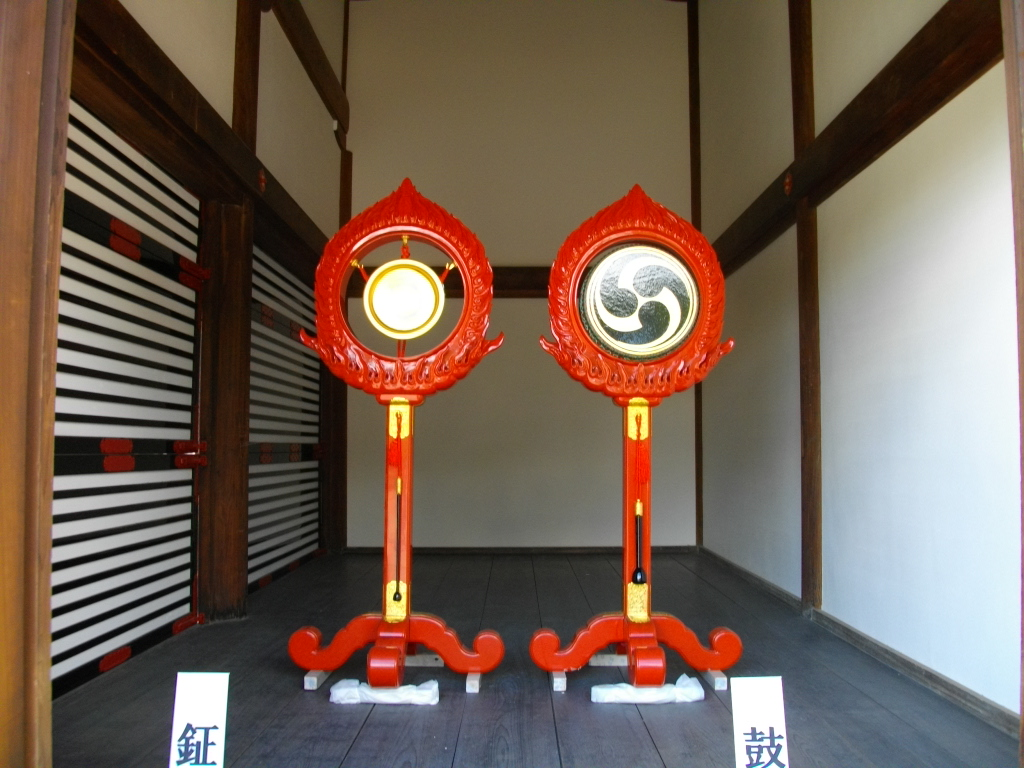
Shōko

The shōko (鉦鼓) is a small bronze gong, struck with two horn beaters, used in gagaku. It is suspended in a vertical frame and comes in three sizes. In Buddhist music and Japanese folk music the instrument is called kane/shō.
