= Shakubyoshi =

Japanese percussion instrument

The Shakubyoshi (kanji: 笏拍子) is a Japanese musical instrument consisting of two wooden slabs that are struck together. It is the oldest Japanese percussion instrument and is used to keep time in ancient genres tied to gagaku. Its dimensions are 36 centimetres in length, 2.4 centimetres in width at the base, 3.9 centimetres at the tip and 1 centimetre thickness on average. It is held at the base.
