= Yamatogoto =

Japanese plucked bridge zither

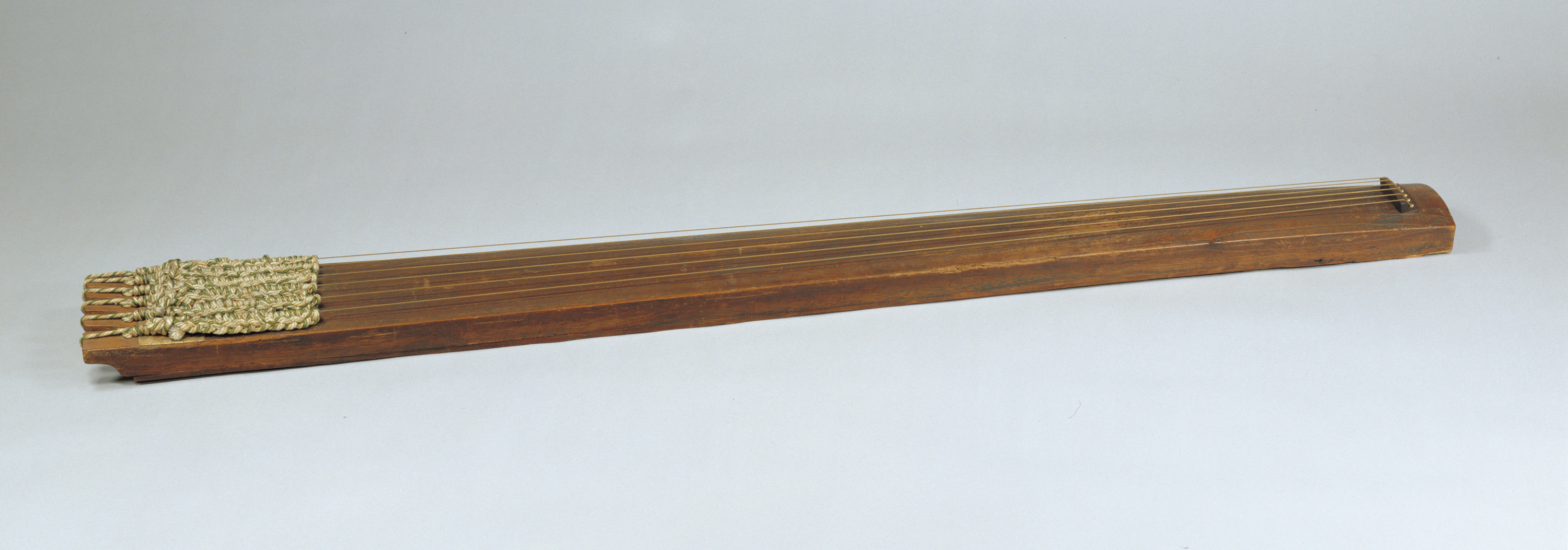
19th century (Edo period) yamato-goto (shown here without bridges); collection of the Tokyo National Museum

The yamatogoto (大和琴 / やまとごと), also called wagon (和琴 / わごん) and azumagoto (東琴 / あずまごと), is a six- or seven-stringed plucked bridge zither which, unlike the koto and other stringed instruments, is believed to be truly native to Japan, and not imported from mainland Asia. Both names translate literally to "Japanese stringed instrument."

According to Shintō myth as written in the Kojiki, the yamatogoto played an important role in the origins of Japan itself. In the myth, Amaterasu, goddess of the sun, is insulted by her brother Susano-o no Mikoto and hides in a cave, refusing to emerge. The world is therefore plunged into darkness. Amaterasu is eventually coaxed out of her cave by the goddess Ame-no-Uzume, who performs a dance outside the cave, to music provided by the twanging of six hunting bows. Amused by the music, and by the entertained sounds of the other gods, Amaterasu leaves the cave and returns to the firmament. The six bows are lashed together to form an instrument, and the first wagon or yamatogoto is born.

The instrument's form has changed very little since the eighth century. Similar in shape to the more commonly known koto, the yamatogoto is narrower, as it has fewer strings. Bridges are made from the natural forks of tree branches, particularly maple trees, according to tradition. Unlike many instruments, the yamatogoto's strings are not arranged in a scale, from low to high pitch, but in a preset melodic sequence which is played in rhythmic patterns. Another common playing technique involves a quick glissando across all the strings, with all but the last string played immediately muted with the hand, thus allowing only the last string to resonate.

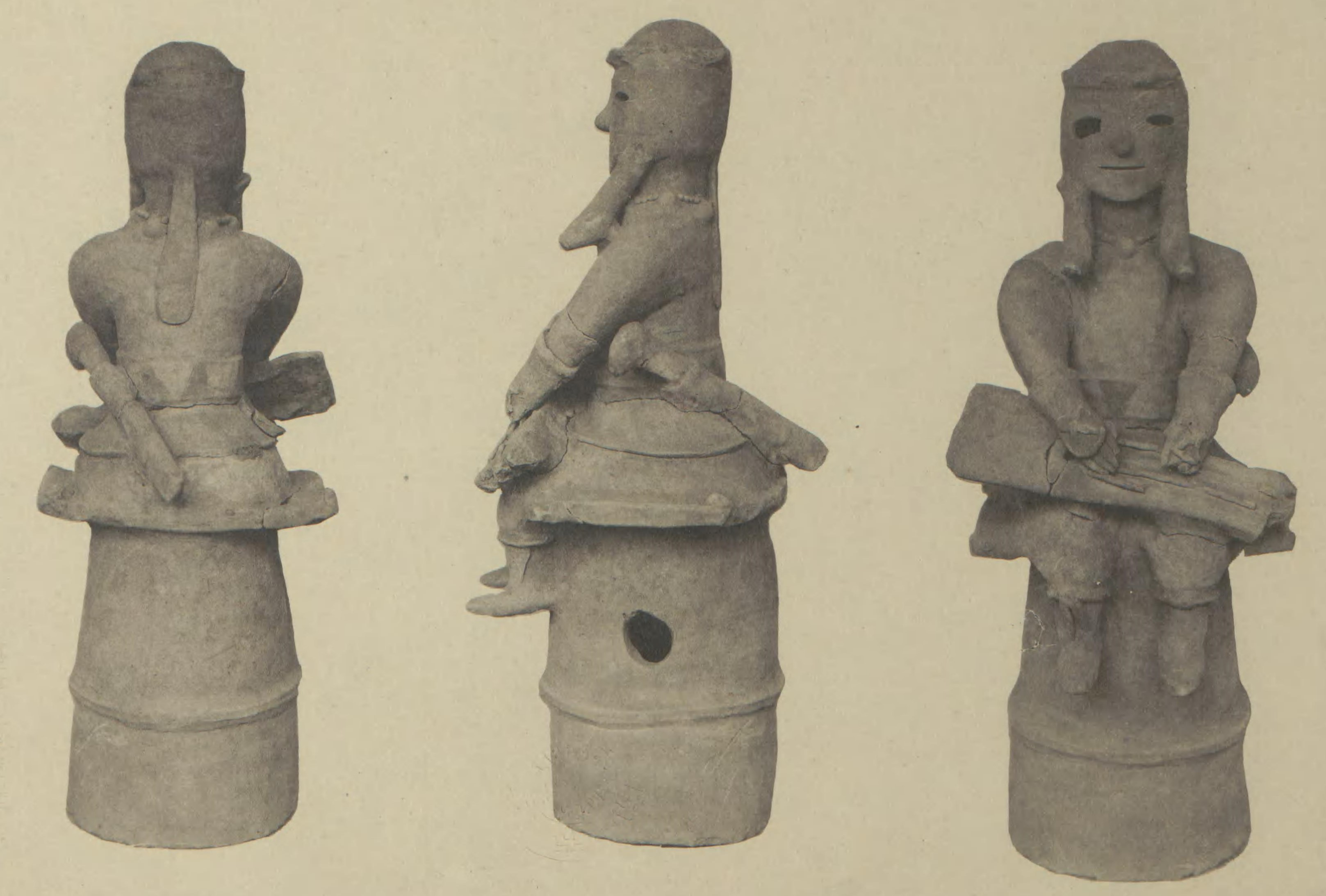
Haniwa playing a yamato-goto, Aikawa Archaeological Museum

Today, the instrument is used only in the Shintō ceremonial/court music called gagaku, and even then it is not common. Nevertheless, its central role in Japanese mythology allows it to retain some reverence.
