= Suzu (bell) =

Type of bell used in Shinto

Suzu (鈴) are round, hollow Japanese Shinto bells that contain pellets that sound when agitated. They are somewhat like a jingle bell in form, though the materials produce a coarse, rolling sound. Suzu come in many sizes, ranging from tiny ones on good luck charms (called omamori (お守り)) to large ones at shrine entrances. Suzu are, however, classified as small bells, since big bells are referred to as kane. The former is associated with Shinto and shrines while the latter is related to Buddhist temples and ceremonies.

At Shinto shrines, large suzu drape over entrances, as it is said that ringing them calls kami, allowing one to acquire positive power and authority, while repelling evil. Handheld clustered suzu, similar to jingle bells, are used musically at Shinto ceremonies. There are ceremonies, for instance, where female performers dance with suzu bells such as those with some sort of short blade at their center. The bell's cool tinkles are also considered psychological air-conditioning for the summer since their clear ringing is considered cool and refreshing.

In Edo Castle, the larger corridor to the Ōoku, which only the shōgun was allowed to enter, was called Osuzu Rōka (御鈴廊下, large corridor of the bells), derived from the ringing of the suzu bells to announce his entrance.

Suzu were traditionally made by metal craft artisans. With the onset of industrialisation, they were made by machines. The ones produced by hand however are still considered of higher quality due to the richer and more melodious sound.

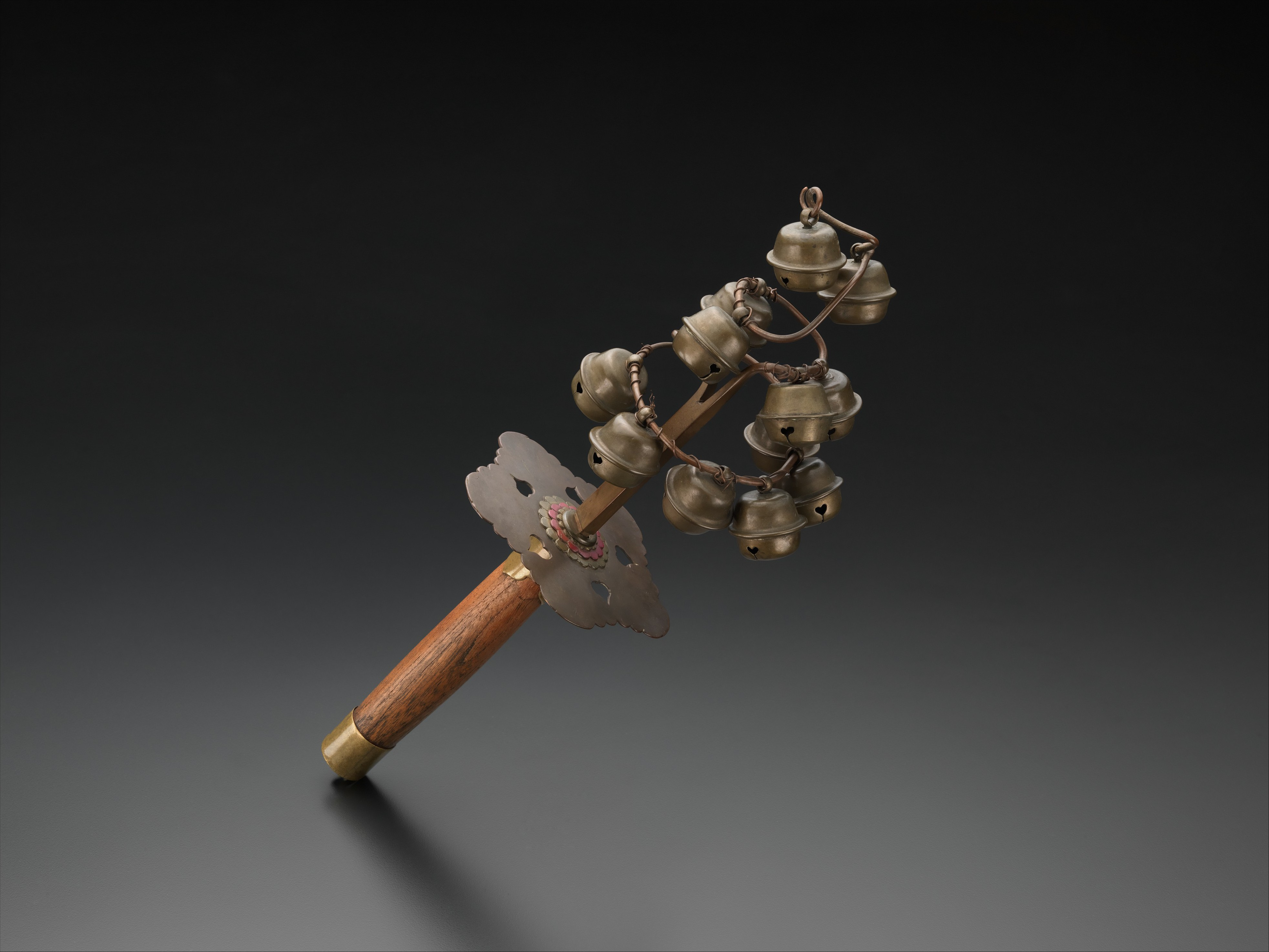
17th century kagura suzu from Miwa, Nara Prefecture, Japan, at the Metropolitan Museum of Art

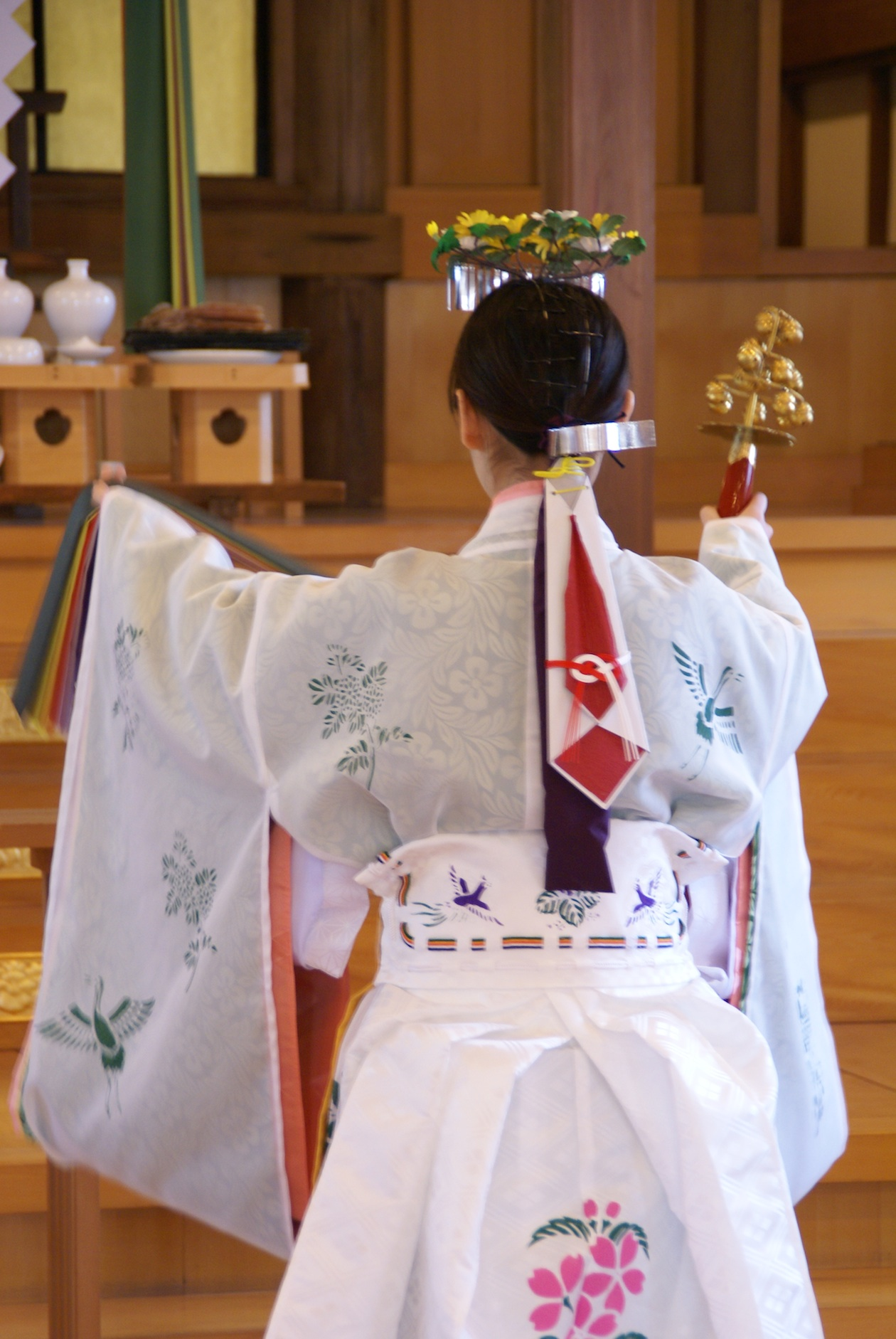
Miko with suzu bells in her right hand

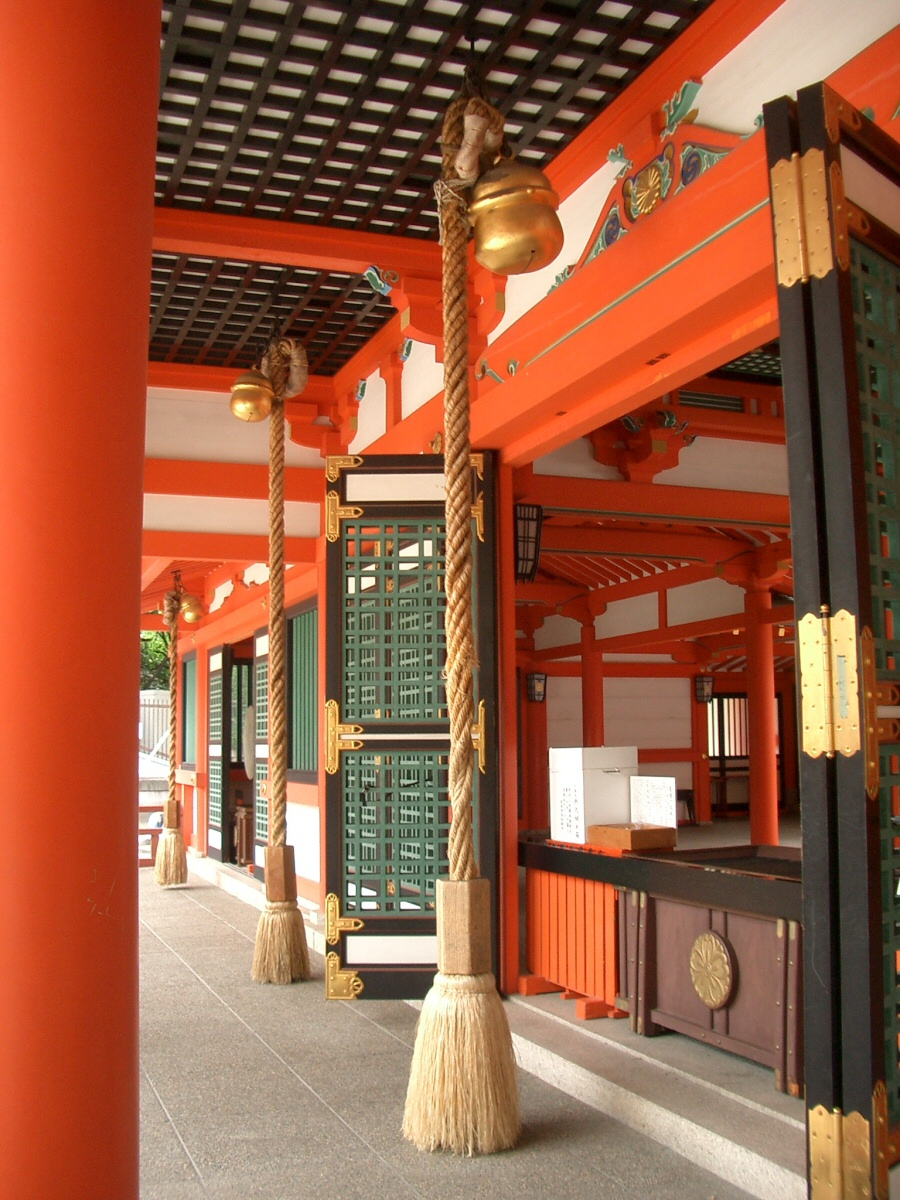
Suzu hanging under the eaves of a Shinto shrine

== Other references ==
Suzu is also a female name in Japan, meaning "bell" or "tin". The kanji for suzu is often used to form a compound name, such as the well-known surname Suzuki, meaning "bell tree" – the bell with the thick rope hanging down almost to the floor and looking like a tree trunk.

== See also ==
- Fūrin
- Kagura suzu
