= Kim Duk-soo =

Korean traditional musician

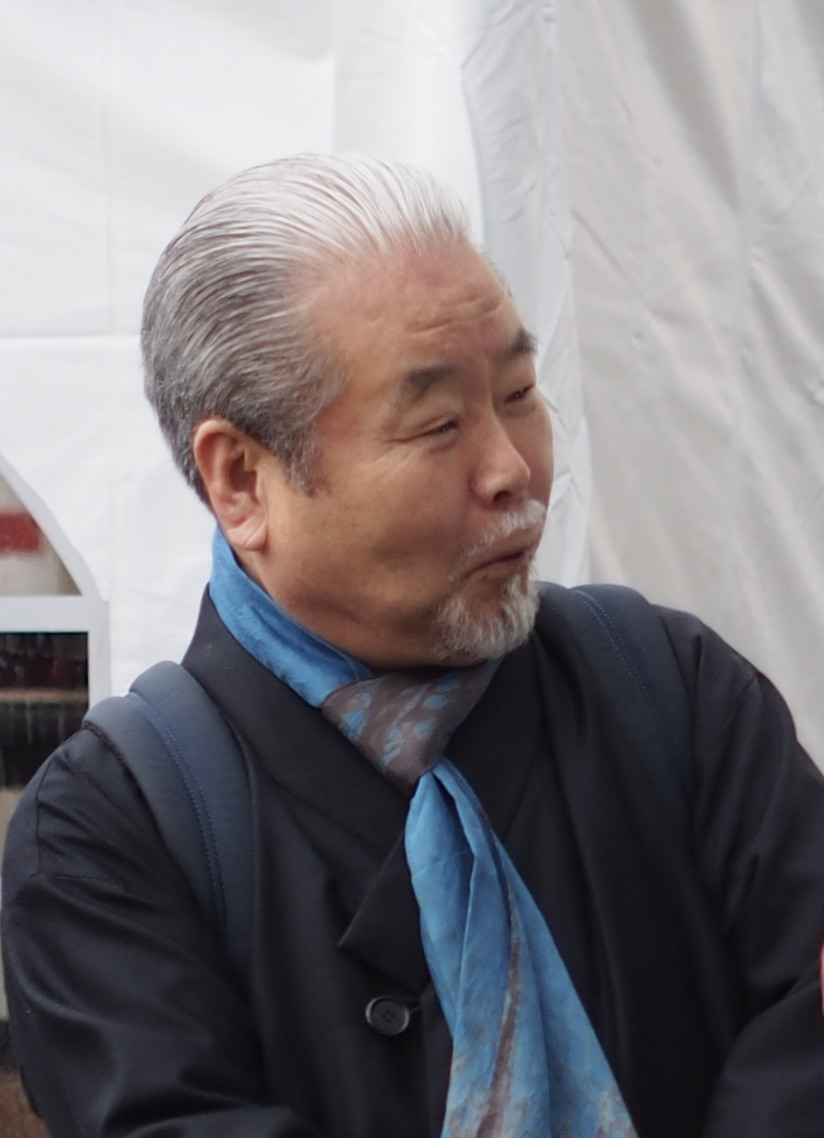
Kim in 2024

Kim Duk-soo (Korean: 김덕수; born September 23, 1952) is a South Korean traditional musician and the founding professor of the School of Korean Traditional Arts at the Korea National University of Arts. He is best known for creating the samul nori genre of Korean music.

== Biography ==
Kim was born in Daejeon, South Korea on September 23, 1952. He began his music career at the age of five when joined the Namsadang group, a wandering artists troupe, first as a child acrobat, then a drummer. At age seven, Kim became the youngest person to win the President's Award in the 1959 National Folk Music Contest. A few years later, Kim began touring internationally with group such as the Little Angels Children's Folk Ballet of Korea, performing at the Mexico and Montreal Olympics, as well as the Osaka EXPO.

In 1978, Kim, alongside his colleagues Kim Yong-bae, Lee Kwang-soo, and Choi Jong-sil, formed the SamulNori group. The group used four main instruments: kkwaenggwari, jing, buk, and janggu, the latter of which Kim played. They performed indoors, as, under the Park Chung-hee administration, traditional instruments were associated with student protests, and playing them outside could lead to arrest. The samul nori genre expanded from this initial ensemble, as more groups started to play the same music style. Samul nori soon gained popularity both nationally, especially among the urban youth, and globally, with the quartet being invited to perform in Tokyo and at the opening of Disney World Resort’s Epcot Centre in Florida in 1982. In 1985, the group began touring Europe.

In 1993, the original samul nori quartet disbanded, as a result of internal conflicts, burnout, and financial issues. However the same year, Kim founded a large samul nori orchestra called Hanullim (Korean: 한울림). The orchestra seeks to promote samul nori performance.

Kim was appointed as the founding professor of the School of Korean Traditional Arts at the Korea National University of Arts in 1993.

Kim has won numerous awards, including the Fukuoka Arts and Culture Prize and the Order of Cultural Merit. He was also listed as one of the "50 Most Distinguished Koreans in the 50 Years since National Liberation" by the Chosun Ilbo.
