= Imsil pilbong nongak =

Korean traditional folk music style

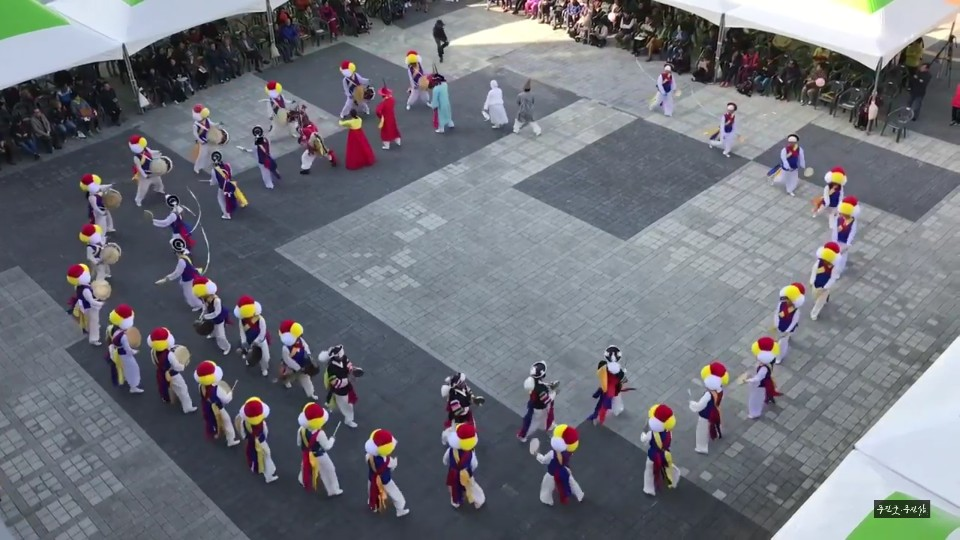
Imsil pilbong nongak

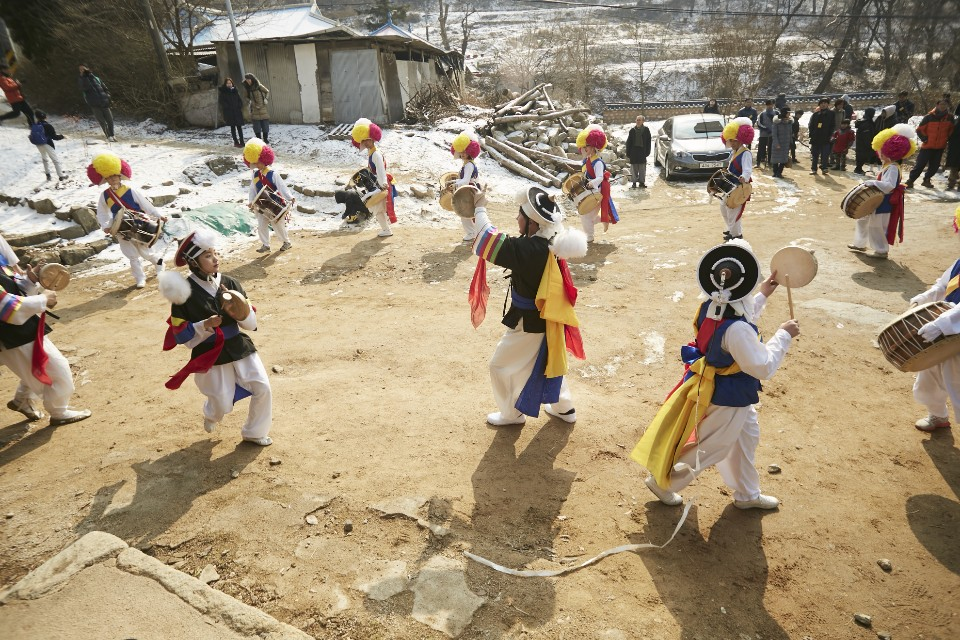
Playing 'Imsil Pilbong nongak'

Imsil pilbong nongak (Korean: 임실필봉농악) is a type of Korean folk music (pungmul-nori) from Pilbong-ri, Gangjin-myeon, Imsil-gun, North Jeolla province. It was designated as No.11-5 asset of the Important Intangible Cultural Property by the South Korean government. It was added to the UNESCO intangible cultural heritage list on November 27, 2014. It passed on the tradition of Honam-jwado nongak and was made famous by Yang Sun-yong (양순용; 梁順龍, 1994–1996)

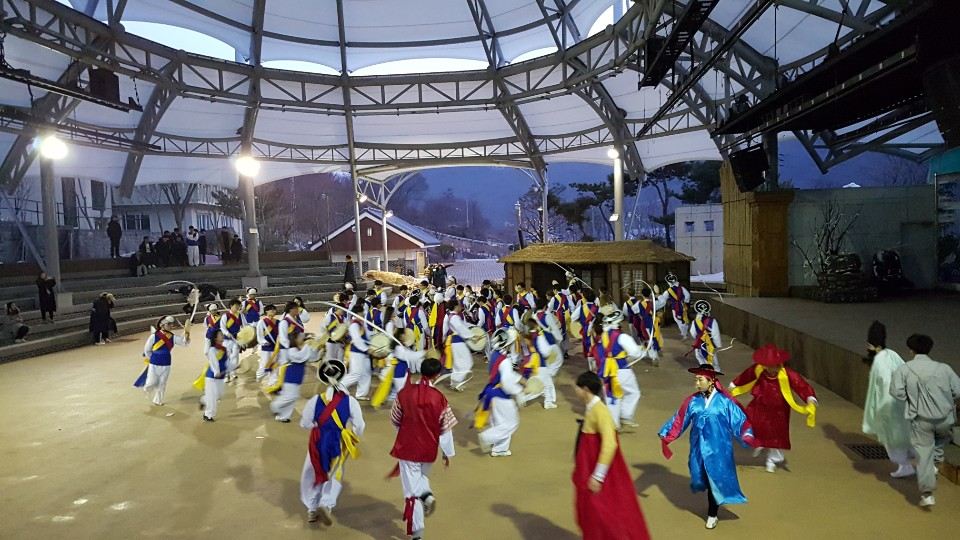
Students learning 'Imsil pilbong nongak'

== History ==
Pilbong Nongak was made by Park Hak-sam from Lee Hwa-chun who was a famous performer of kkwaenggwari at that time. Since then, Song Ju-ho and Yang Soon-yong have developed further. It was designated as No.11-5 asset of Important Intangible Cultural Property by the South Korean government in 1989. Yang Soon-yong is the sang-seo (of Philbong-gut until his death, his son Yang Jin-sung followed.)

== Features ==
The characteristics of Imsil Pilbong nongak, unlike other nongak, are:

- Regular intervals from ilchae (one strike) to chilchae (seven strike).
- Performers perform movements as they play to increase their excitement, revealing their artistic qualities.
- The second half of a nongak performance shows a series of shamanistic and artistic performances with different people who do not play.

== Types ==
In Pilbong village, Madang balbgi (마당 밟기) is performed on the first day of the year, Mae-gut (매굿) is performed on the last day of the year, Dang san-je (당산제) is played for nine days on Jeong-wol, Nodigosa gut (노디고사굿). It is performed on the fifth day of BorumGulgung-gut(걸궁굿), which is performed when visiting other villages for money or grain, Durae-gut (두레굿) for summer farming, etc.

== Performance ==
=== Role (Chi-bae) and clothing ===
==== Seo(kkwaenggwari) Chibae ====
The performer wears a black half-sleeved outer called Duguri with the end retail named Saek-dong. A gold and red cloth is inserted in the back using two pins, attached like wings, with a blue band around the waist. The costume is completed by a top hat and a white crane fur called ‘Bu-po’.

=== Janggu Chibae ===
The performer wears a blue vest on a white pants. A yellow cloth sits on the left shoulder and a red cloth on the right, with a blue cloth on the waist. The head carries a towel and a flower hat. The best performer is Sang-Janggu. Unlike Honam-udo nongak, one or more Janggu chibae of Honam-jwado plays Sul-Janggu’ in combination.

- Buk Chibae

The performer wears a blue vest on a white pants. A yellow cloth sits on the left shoulder and a red cloth on the right, with a blue cloth on the waist. The head carries a towel and a flower hat. Buk Chibae makes a big sound and helps the sound of Janggu.

==== Jing Chibae ====
The performer wears a blue vest on a white pants. A yellow cloth sits on the left shoulder and a red cloth on the right, with a blue cloth on the waist. The head carries a towel and a flower hat. Jing Chibae creates a mood by making a long, loud sound.

==== Sogo Chibae ====
The performer wears a blue vest on a white pants. A yellow cloth sits on the left shoulder and a red cloth on the right, with a blue cloth on the waist. The head carries a towel and a flower hat. Sogo Chibae is the main character of Pilbong-gut. They have fun playing and dancing to make Pangut look diverse and lively.

==== Chae-Sang Chibae ====
The performer wears a blue vest on a white pants. A yellow cloth sits on the left shoulder and a red cloth on the right, with a blue cloth on the waist. The hat is called ‘Chae-Sang’ and attaches a long paper line that spins it. (Hodli, who was a mascot for the 1988 Olympics, wore it on his head.) Splendid movement makes the Pangut dynamic.

==== Jap-sek ====
The actors and other performers featured in Imsil Pilbong Nongak include the lead actor (hunter, daeposu), male clown or shaman's husband (changbu), monk, nobleman (yangban), child apprentice to the lead gong player (nonggu), new bride (gaksi), flower boys and girls (hwadong). In some of the quieter acts these actors play the leading role. They are all free to move around the Pan-gut, making the Pan-gut dynamic with jokes, gestures, and dancing, and become a bridge between performers and audiences.

=== Sequence ===
The Pan-gut of Imsil Pilbong nongak is divided into the front and back part. The first part consists of music of starting gut, gilgut, chae-gut, hohu-gut, pungryu-gut. The back part consists of three-'bangowljin, misigi-youngsan, gajin-youngsan, chum-gut (dol-gut), subakchigi, etc.

== Notable performers ==
The leader of the Imsil Pilbong nongak is called a sangseo.

- Lee Hwa-chun (none)
- Park Hak-sam (10. Nov. 1884 – 6. Dec. 1968)
- Song Ju-ho (1899 – ?)
- Yang Soon-yong (1. Aug. 1998 – ?)
- Yang Jin-sung (1. May. 1966 ~ )

== See also ==
- Pungmul
- Namsadang
- Pyeongtaek nongak
- Samul nori
- Traditional music of Korea
