= Sinawi =

Traditional Korean music style

- Hangul: 시나위
- RR: sinawi
- MR: sinawi

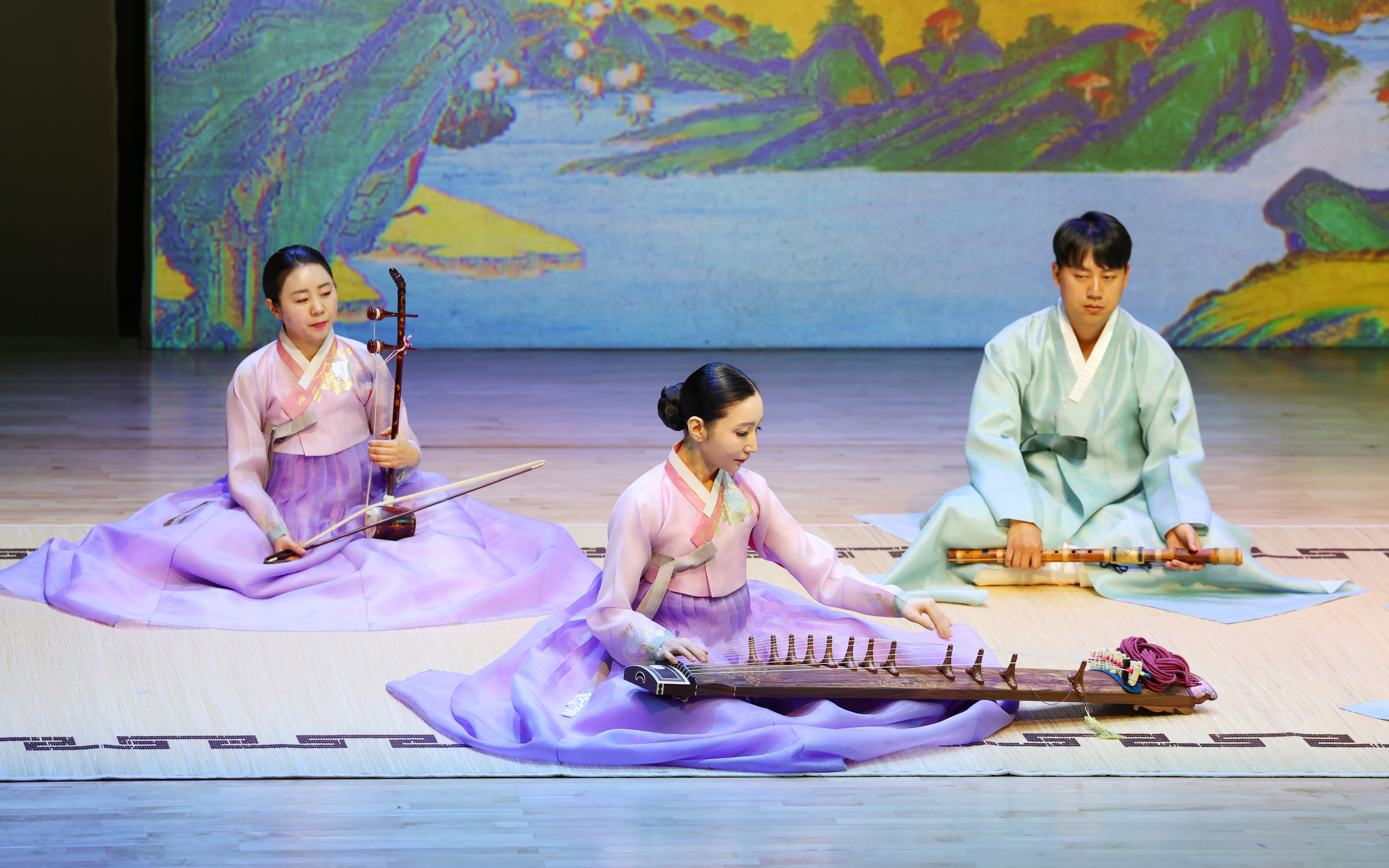
Sinawi at the National Gugak Center

Sinawi, sometimes spelled shinawi, is a traditional Korean music. It is performed improvisationally by a musical ensemble, and traditionally accompanies the rites of Korean shamanism. The style first emerged in the Chungcheong and Jeolla provinces, but is now widespread. The traditional sinawi ensemble followed the principle of sam-hyeon-yuk-gak (三絃六角), with two flutes, a haegeum, a daegeum, a janggu hourglass-drum, and a large buk drum. However, today other traditional Korean instruments such as the gayageum and geomungo are also often included.

== See also ==
- Gut (ritual)
- Muak
- Sinism
- Korean culture
