= Tori Ensemble =

South Korean folk band

- Origin: Republic of South Korea
- Genres: Traditional music of Korea, jazz, contemporary classical music
- Years active: 2007–present
- Members: Yoon-Jeong Heo; Erik Friedlander; Kang Kwon Soon; Young Chi Min; Ned Rothenberg; Satoshi Takeishi
- Website: http://www.myspace.com/toriensemble

Tori Ensemble is a South Korean folk band.

The Tori Ensemble sextet, formed in 2007 led by the geomungo player Yoon-Jeong Heo, plays compositions of Korean traditional music, jazz and contemporary classical music. The other five members of the ensemble are Erik Friedlander (cello), Kang Kwon Soon (Korean traditional voice), Young Chi Min (daegum, chang-go), Ned Rothenberg (clarinets and shakuhachi) and Satoshi Takeishi (percussion). The band has been endorsed by the Korea Foundation, Korea Society and Ministry of Culture, Sports and Tourism of the Republic of South Korea as one of the most representative bands for Korean traditional music. The band has performed at venues worldwide, including countries such as Australia, Malaysia, New Zealand, Slovenia and the United States.
