= Muak =

Muak may refer to:

== Music genre ==
- Muak (Muism) (Korean: 무악; Hanja: 巫樂) : Korean traditional music of Muism
- Muak (Korean traditional dance music) (Korean: 무악; Hanja: 舞樂) : Korean traditional music with dancing

== Place ==
=== South Korea ===
- Muak (Korean: 무악; Hanja: 毋岳) : other name of Ansan mountain in Seoul
- Muak-dong (Korean: 무악동; Hanja: 毋岳洞) : a neighborhood in Jongno District of Seoul
- Muakjae station: a subway station in Seodamun District of Seoul

=== Thailand ===
- Muak Lek district : an amphoe of Saraburi province

== Other ==
- Muak language : a minority language of Burma-China border region
