= Namsadang =

Korean traditional traveling performers

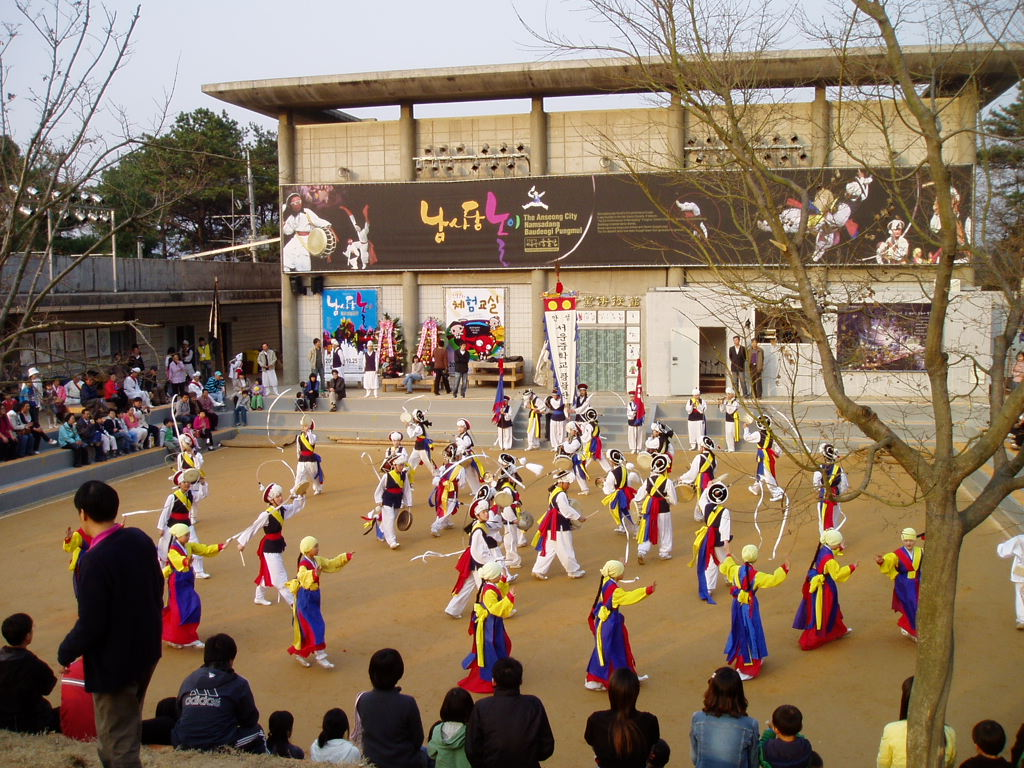
- Pungmul nori, one of the six nori performed by namsadang

Korean name
- Hangul: 남사당
- Hanja: 男寺黨
- Revised Romanization: Namsadang
- McCune–Reischauer: Namsatang

The namsadang (Korean pronunciation: [nam.sa.daŋ]) is a Korean itinerant troupe which consists of male performers who present various performing arts such as acrobatics, singing, dancing and playing like a circus. It is said that namsadang was spontaneously formed before 1900 during the Joseon period and used to wander about marketplaces and villages. The troupe was considered the lowest class in society along with cheonmin (vulgar commoners) or baekjeong (butchers), so that very few historical documents remain on them. However, since a record that a puppet show was performed during the Silla period (57 BCE – 935 CE) has been found, it is assumed that similar types of itinerant companies appeared in Korean history a long time ago.

During the late Joseon Dynasty, there were several namsadang, but the one whose base was set in Cheongryongsa temple (청룡사) in Anseong, Gyeonggi Province was the most famous. They became called namsadang because the troupe were composed of only men and "nam" (남, 男) means a male in Korean. Later, a few female members were accepted to join in the group.

The six performances which the troupe performs are collectively called Namsadang nori (남사당놀이), literally meaning nori (놀이) performed by namsadang. Nori refers to play, game or performance in Korean. The namsadang nori includes pungmul nori (풍물, Korean spinning hat dance), beona nori (버나놀이, spinning hoops and dishes), salpan (살판, tumbling), eoreum (어름, tightrope dancing), deotboegi (덧뵈기, mask dance drama), and deolmi (덜미, puppet play). All six nori are associated with each other and integrate various activities such as music, feat, acrobatics, stunt, play, dance, and mask dance. Originally there were ten performances on Namsadang-nori but only six have been brought down until now.

On December 7, 1964, the South Korean government designated deolmi (puppet play) as the third Important Intangible Cultural Property. On August 1, 1988, all six performances of Namsadang nori were included as Important Intangible Cultural Properties as well.

== Troupe organization ==
Namsadang usually consisted of 40 – 50 members of all ages. The head of the group is called kkokdusoe (꼭두쇠, Korean pronunciation: [k͈okt͈usʰwe]) and the second-in-command is called golbaengisoe (골뱅이쇠 [kolbɛŋiːsʰwe]). Underneath there were tteunsoe (뜬쇠 [t͈ɯːnsʰwe]), gayeol (가열 [kajʌl]), ppiri (삐리 [p͈iɾi]), jeoseungpae (저승패 [tɕʌsʰɯŋpʰɛ]), and deungjimkkun (등짐꾼 [tɯŋdʑimk͈un]). Tteunsoe is the head of the each performance or senior performer and gayeol is a performer. Ppiri is an apprentice. In addition, jeoseungpae refers to elderly members and deungjimkkun is porters.

The troupe was well-organized and strictly disciplined by rules. Because entertainers like singers or actors were often despised in that age, the troupe recruited its members among the orphans, poor farmers` children and sometimes even through kidnapping. They were not well-paid. Very often they were offered only meals and beds and a small amount of money. They had tough lives.

The troupe may have functioned as a homosexual community, with each member taking the role of Sutdongmo, "butch", or Yodongmo, "queen".

== Namsadang nori ==
Namsadang's yeonhui (연희; 演戱) or performances were held on the ground instead of theaters. When namsadang found a village, they had to get a permission from the leader of the village in order to present their talents. Members of namsadang performed the six nori in the biggest yard of the village. The sequence of six nori is as follows.

=== Pungmul nori ===
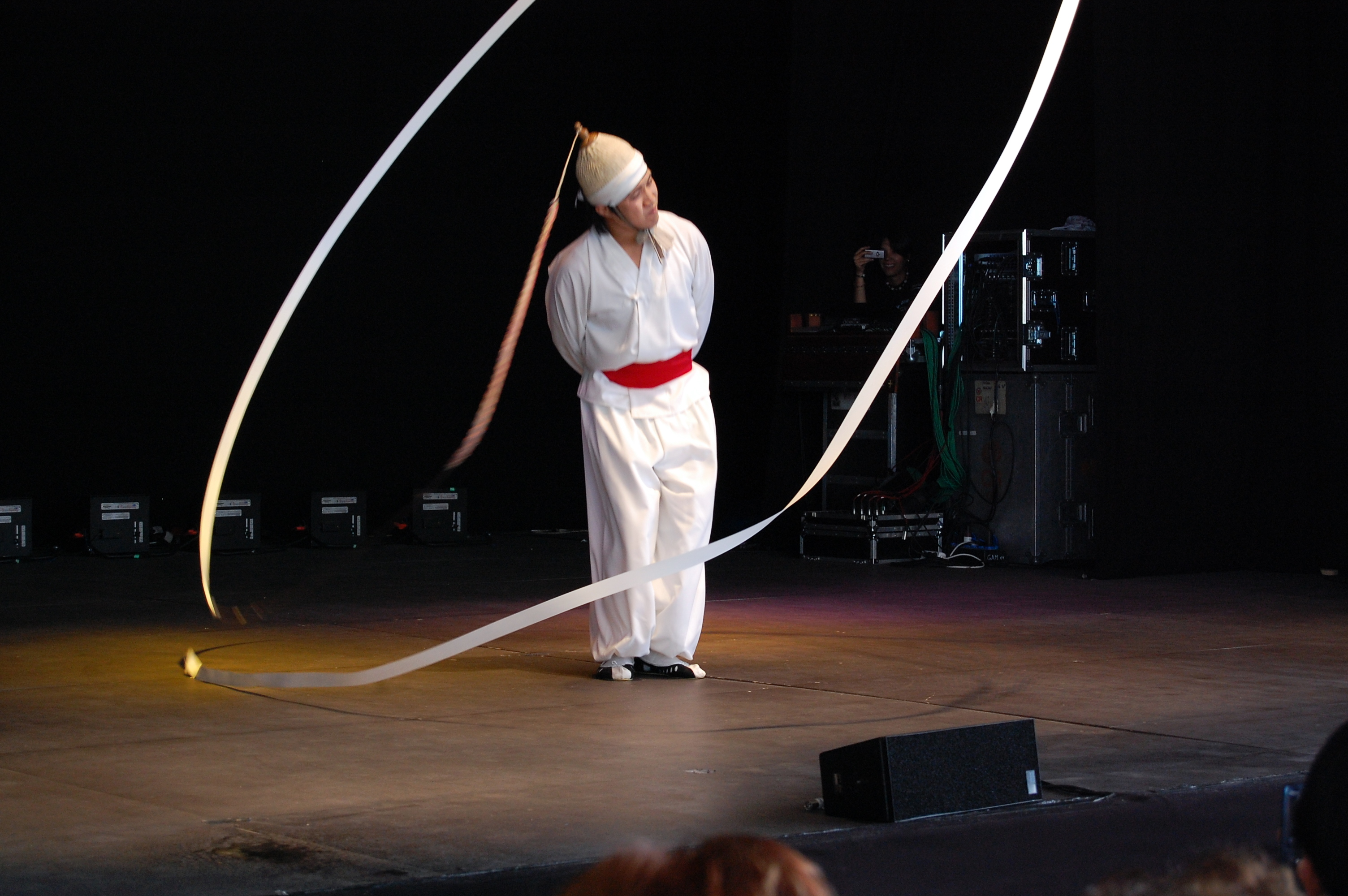
Sangmo nori

Pungmul nori (풍물놀이) is the first performance of namsadang nori, combined with music, dance, sangmo nori (상모놀이, spinning streamer hat performance) and various other activities. Pungmul instruments comprise four percussion instruments such as jing (gong), kkwaenggwari (another kind of gong), buk (drum), janggu (double-headed drum) and several sogo (tabors) and nallari/Taepyeongso (double-reed), which make unique melodies and rhythms. The music played by the four instruments of pungmul (i.e. jing, kkwaenggwari, buk, janggu) is called samul nori (four piece playing).

=== Beona-nori ===
Beaona nori (버나놀이) is a performance with beona. This can be a dish, a basin, or a sieve frame. Performers spin and toss the beona into the air by using a tobacco pipe or a long wooden stick while exchanging witty talks with a clown called maehossi (매호씨) or sorikkun (소리꾼).

=== Salpan ===
The word salpan (살판) comes from the saying that "if you do well, you will be alive (salpan), and if you don't, you will be dead" (jookeulpan). It is also called ttangjaeju (땅재주), literally meaning talents held on the ground. The performer executes various acrobatic feats called "gondu" (곤두) while exchanging humorous banter with a maehossi (clown).

=== Eoreum ===
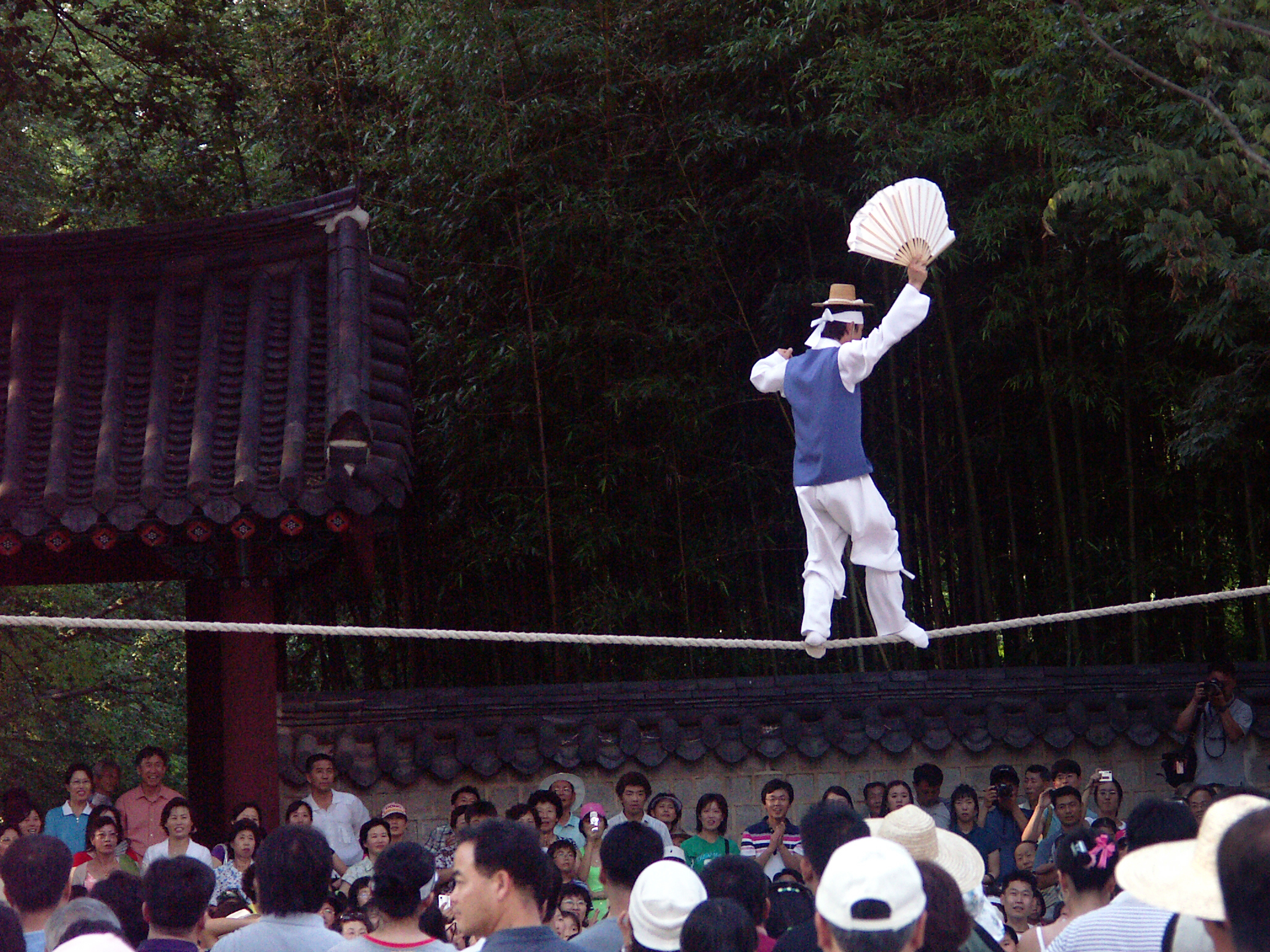
Tightrope dancing by namsadang, called either eoreum or jultagi

Eoreum (어름) or jultagi (줄타기) is tightrope dancing. It is called "eoreum" because the nori is as hard and cautious as walking on thin ice (eoreum means "thin ice" in Korean). The performer or eoreum-sani dances, sings songs, and does aerial stunts on the rope which is tightly fastened 3 meters off the ground. The performer also exchanges witty talks with a maehossi on the ground and all his performance is accompanied with special rhythm made by a drum.

=== Deotboegi ===
Deotboegi (덧뵈기) means "See with the mask on". Generally, this performance has good humor and tendency to tickle the fancy of the public. Deotboegi gains high popularity among audience. However it also contains keen satire on the society and yangban or the noble class of Joseon Dynasty.

=== Deolmi ===
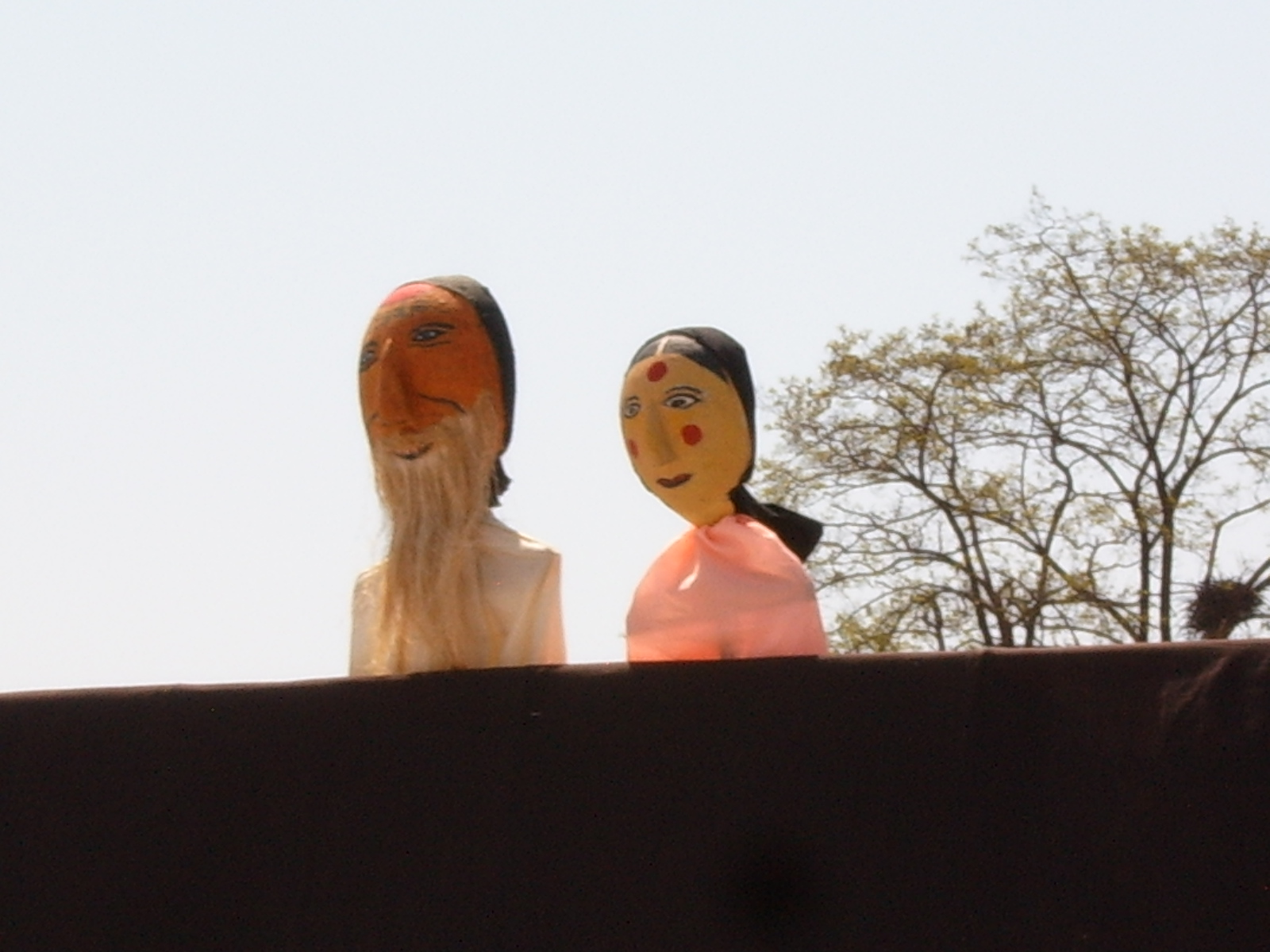
Puppets used for deolmi

Deolmi (덜미) or puppet play is played last. It is also known as "kkokdugaksi noreum" (꼭두각시놀음), which comprises the three words: kkokdu (puppet), gaksi (maiden) and noreum (nori, performance). In addition, the puppetry is called "bakcheomji noreum" (박첨지놀음) and "hongdongji nori" (홍동지놀이), all of which are named after the main characters in the play. In Korea, puppet plays appeared first in the early age of the Silla period (BC 57 – 935 AD). All the other puppet plays disappeared later, but deolmi survives and has been brought down through generations. Its main story is about the resistance against the dominant aristocratic class and satirizes corrupt Buddhist priests. So the play appealed to the commoners and the poor public, which perhaps explains its popularity, and ultimately why it has survived so many years. It was designated as Important Intangible Cultural Property before the other parts of the namsadang nori.

Generally performers use about 40 puppets and around 10 hand props.

== Baudeogi ==
Probably the most famous and eminent person ever in the history of namsadang is Baudeogi Her real name is Kim Amdeok (김암덕). She was born as the daughter of a poor peasant farmer and joined the troupe at the age of 5 in 1853. She had the great makings of the six performances, and with her amazing skills and artistic talent, became a big star among the public. When Baudeogi was 15, she was unanimously elected as kkokdusoe (leader of the troupe) by the troupe members. That was quite unusual because at that time only male could be a leader and she was so young. This might prove her talents and high popularity. In 1865, Heungseon Daewongun, the regency called in her troupe to court and had them cheer workers who engaged in constructing a new palace. They made a great success in their job, and the regency gave her a jade headband button. At that time, only high rank officials could possess and her fame spread nationwide ever since. This is regarded as the beginning of Korean entertainment business as well as Baudeogi is appraised as the first popular entertainer of Korea. The local festival of Anseong is called "Baudeogi Festival" in the honor of her. It is held in Anseong in October every year.

== Cultural significance ==
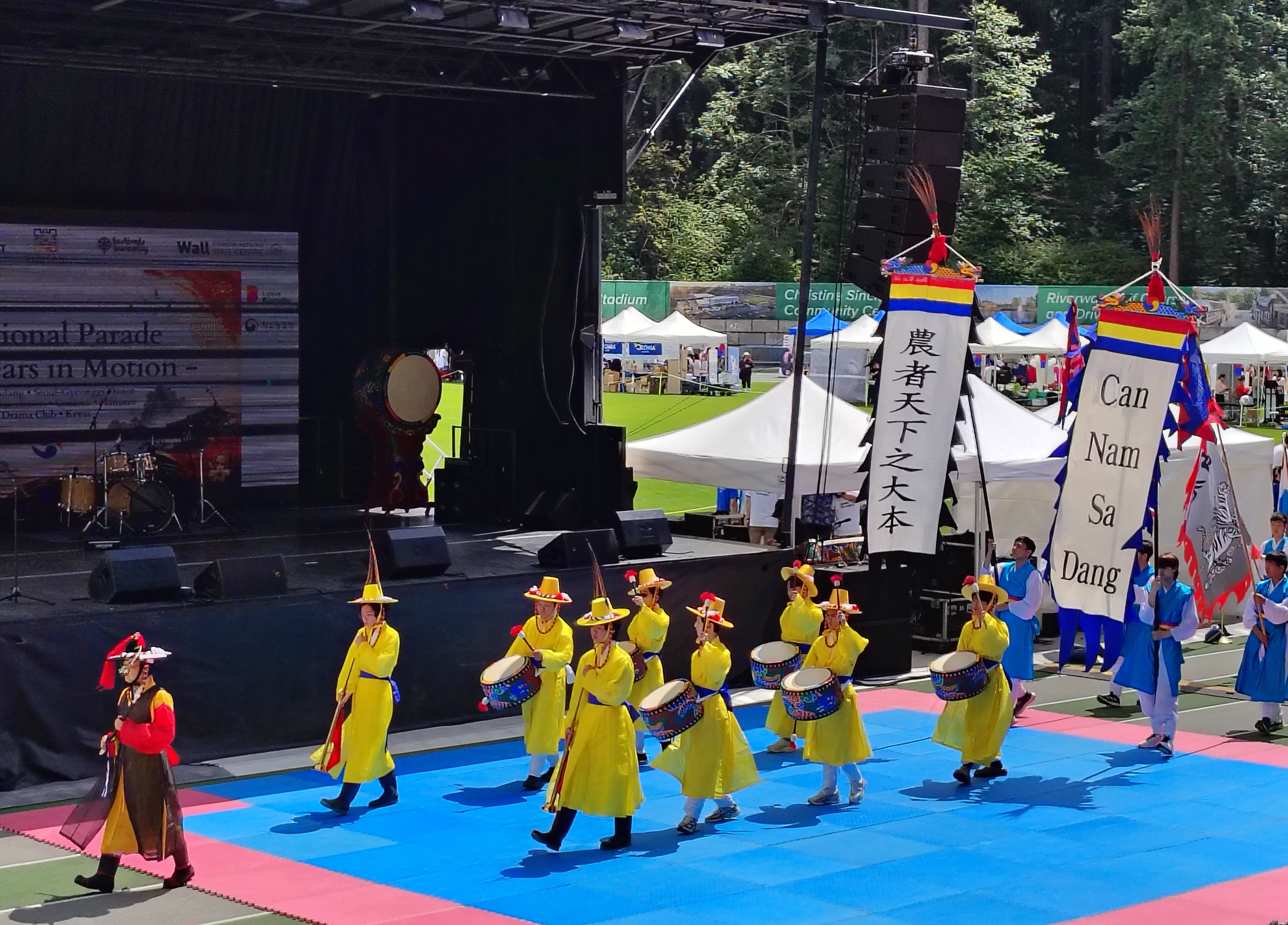
Namsadang parading at the Korean Cultural Festival in Burnaby, Canada

The significance of namsadang nori can be found in its common touch. This came into existence spontaneously and performed for the poor farmers, folks, traders, and other middle-class and low-class people. It functioned as consolation for the public and gained high popularity among the general populace. And though it is not so refined as other Korean musical styles (i.e. Dodeuri) and dances (i.e. Kommu, sword dance) for the noble class, it may be seen as performance meant to convey and have most powerful appeal to emotion.

== Restoration ==
The troupe was re-established in Anseong, which is the birthplace of the old namsadang, to preserve its cultural heritage. The new troupe has its regular performances on every Saturday and also provides overseas performances from time to time.

== See also ==
- Samul nori
- Kkokdugaksi noreum
- The King and the Clown
- Traditional Korean musical instruments
- Important Intangible Cultural Properties of Korea
- Traditional music of Korea
- Dance of Korea
