= Sanjo (music) =

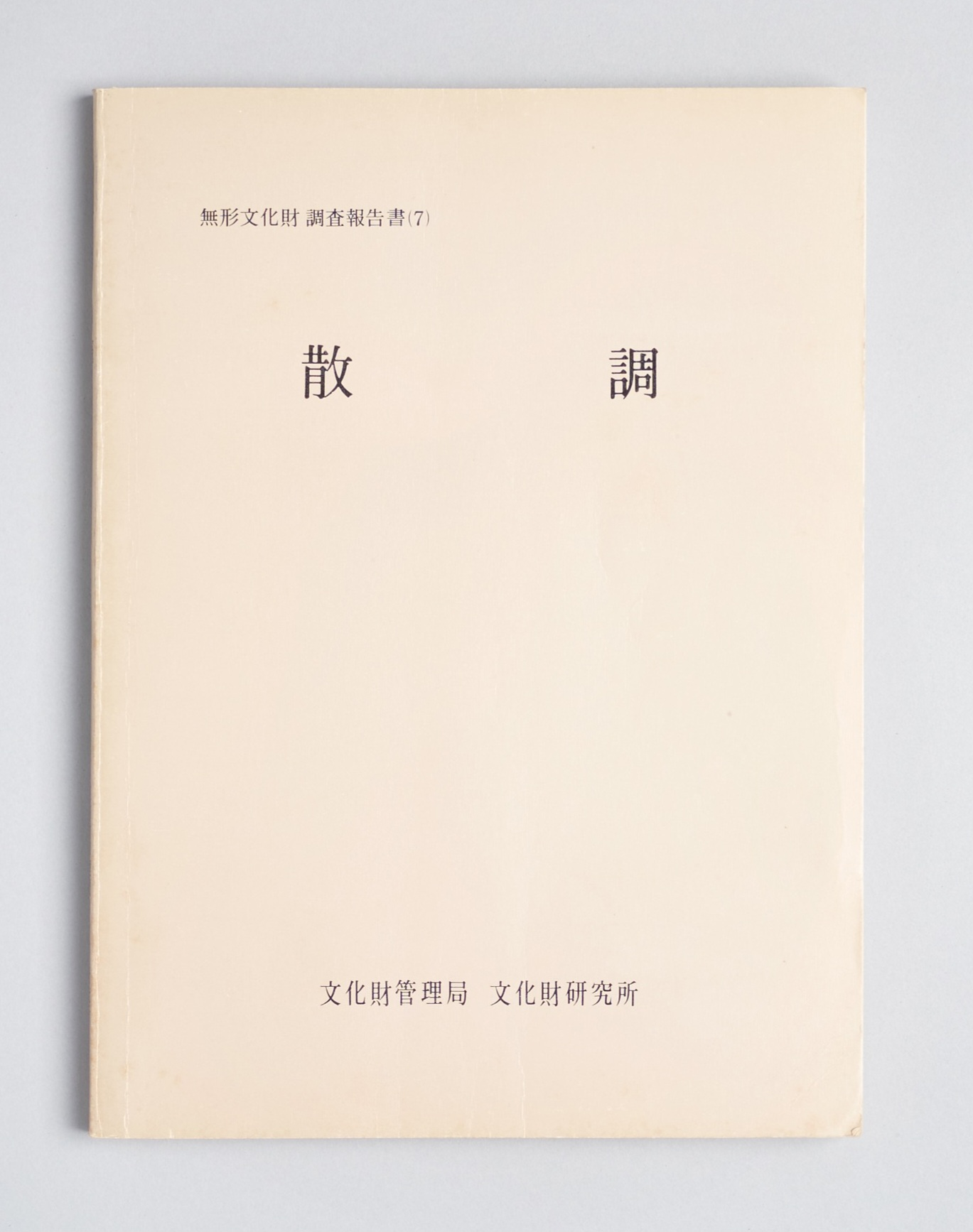
- Intangible Cultural Heritage Report Sanjo

Korean name
- Hangul: 산조
- Hanja: 散調
- RR: sanjo
- MR: sanjo

Sanjo (Korean: 산조), literally meaning 'scattered melodies', is a style of traditional Korean music, involving an instrumental solo accompanied by drumming on the janggu, an hourglass-shaped drum. The art of sanjo is a real crystallization of traditional Korean melody and rhythm which may have been handed down by rote generation after generation. The drummer who beats the janggu also makes chuimsae (exclamations) in order to please the audience. The audience can also express their excited feeling with chuimsae while listening to sanjo. A big chuimsae indicates a good performance, so the musician can make a better performance. Like pansori, chuimsae plays an important role in sanjo. Without chuimsae, the music is meaningless. Chuimsae connects musician and audience during a sanjo performance. Almost every Korean traditional musical instrument is used in sanjo: gayageum, geomungo, daegeum, haegeum, piri, taepyeongso, ajaeng, danso.

Sanjo was said to be developed around 1890 by Kim Chang-jo (1865–1920) for the gayageum. Thereafter, it was expanded to other traditional Korean instruments, including the geomungo and Korean flutes. Its early development was informed by other genres of traditional music, including pansori, sinawi, and the performances of Korean shamanism.

Daegeum sanjo, played on the daegeum (a traditional Korean transverse flute) was developed in the 1920s. It has since become one of the most popular forms of sanjo. Its leading practitioner today is Yi Saenggang.

Sanjo is traditionally identified as a form of minsogak, or folk music.

== Composition ==
The composition of sanjo varies depending on the people, instruments and time. However, usually sanjo starts with a slow jinyangjo rhythm (hangul: 진양조장단; very slow rhythm used in pansori or sanjo) and becomes faster, ending with a very fast rhythm like a danmori rhythm and creating enthusiasm in the audience. Starting from a slow rhythm, the audience can gradually sink into the melody of the song. Sanjo expresses various aspects of the player. Sanjos are not fixed music. The musician can make new music with original variations. Sanjo has endless melodies in which musicians make new compositions that change with the times.

== See also ==
- List of musical genres
- Traditional music of Korea
