= Seonsori =

Seonsori (hangul: 선소리), also known as ipchang (hangul: 입창, hanja: 立唱) ), is a traditional Korean music genre known as "stand-up song." The word of seonsori originated in the word seo-da (hangul: 서다), which means stand in Korean. Koreans play a game while singing seonsori. The leader, called mogab, starts to sing while playing a janggu and the others sing and play a sogo.

The seonsori is sung and performed with a strong voice and enthusiasm. Singers of seonsori are usually men in order to make it energetic and fun. The seonsoris vary in different localities of Korea such as Gyeonggi-do, Seo-do, and Nam-do. The best known seonsori is Gyeonggi seonsori. It also influenced Seodo and Namdo seonsoris.

== Seonsori-Santaryung ==
(hangul: 선소리 산타령, hanja: 山打令)

The Seonsori-Santaryung is an Important Intangible Cultural Property of Korea No. 19. The Seonsori-Santaryung is a specific kind of seonsori. The song lyrics describe the scenery of mountains and a river. This song starts with a slow rhythm and ends with a fast rhythm. Seonsori-Santaryung is reputed to have the most brilliant and vigorous melody in traditional Korean music.
