= Lee Saengkang =

South Korean musician (born 1936)

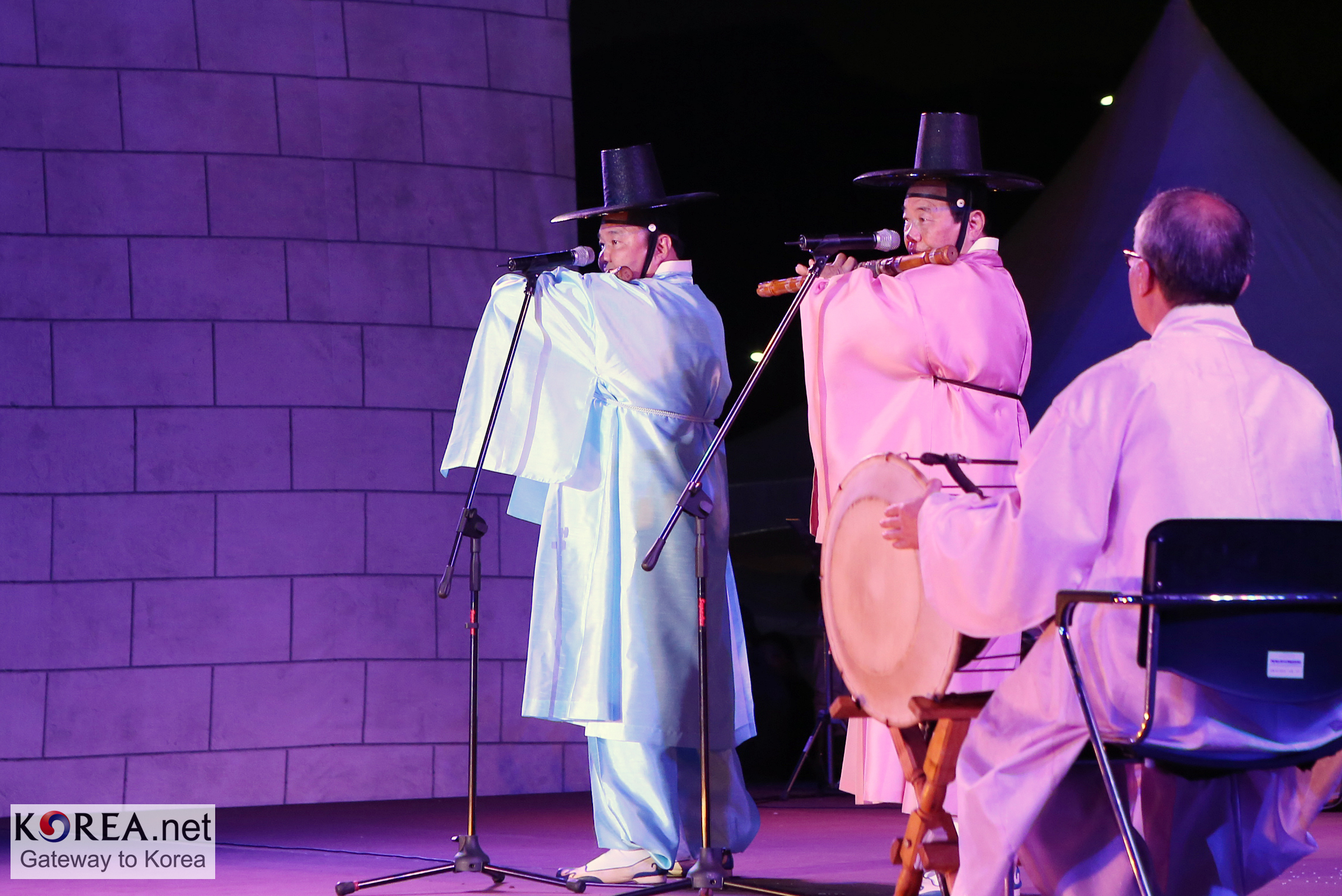

Korean name
- Hangul: 이생강
- RR: I Saenggang
- MR: I Saenggang

Yi Saenggang (Korean: 이생강; born 1936), also known as Lee Saenggang, is a South Korean musician and a leading practitioner of daegeum sanjo, an instrumental style of Korean music played on the daegeum, a large bamboo transverse flute. His musical career spans over 60 years and he has been officially recognized as the master of Important Intangible Cultural Property by the Korean government.
