= Janggu =

Korean traditional drum

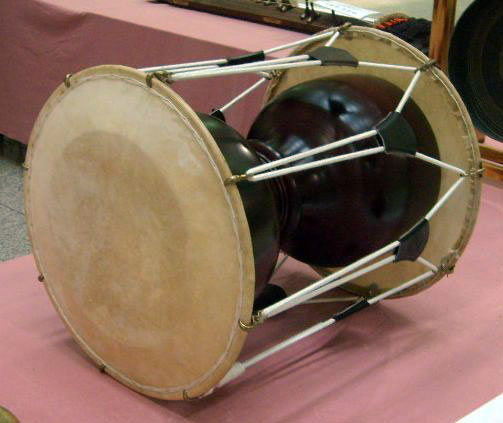
- A janggu drum on its side

Percussion instrument
- Classification: Drum (buk)

Sound sample
- Imsil Pilbong nongak played on the janggu (hwi-mori 휘모리)

- Janggu
- Hangul: 장고 or 장구
- Hanja: 杖鼓
- Revised Romanization: janggo or janggu
- McCune–Reischauer: changgo or changgu

The janggu (Korean: 장구, also transliterated as janggo or changgo) or seyogo (세요고; 細腰鼓; lit. 'slim waist drum') is a drum often used in traditional Korean music. It consists of an hourglass-shaped body with two heads made from various types of leather. The two heads produce sounds of different pitch and timbre, which when played together are believed to represent the harmonious joining of Um and Yang. The janggu is one of the four components of samul nori (사물놀이), alongside the buk (북), jing (징) and kkwaenggwari (꽹과리).

== History ==
The earliest depictions of the instrument were inscribed on a bell belonging to the Silla (57 BC–935 AD) period and in a mural painting of the same period in Goguryeo (37 BC–668 AD) tomb. The oldest written records about an hourglass-shaped drum may be traced to the reign of King Munjong (1047–1084) of Goryeo as a field instrument. The Korean record from 1451 titled Goryeo-sa, or History of Goryeo, in chapter 70, records twenty janggu as the gifts of instruments to be used in the banquet attended by the Song dynasty emperor Huizong to the Goryeo court in Gaeseong in 1114. This book also notes the earliest appearance of the word janggu in a Korean source. Later in chapter 80, for the year 1076, the term janggu-opsa (one who plays or teaches the janggu) is used.

Some argue janggu sounds like rain.

== Structure ==
The janggu may have evolved from the yogo (요고; 腰鼓; lit. 'waist drum'), another similar but smaller Korean drum that is still in use today. The yogo is thought to have originated from the idakka, an Indian instrument introduced to Korea from India during Silla (57 BC–935 AD) period. Evidence of the yogo was depicted on the mural paintings in the tomb of Jipanhyun of Goguryeo, and from the pictures at the temple Gameunsa, the Relics of Buddha, made of bronze in the second year of King Mun (682) during the Unified Silla period. It was during the time of Goryeo that the size of the Janggu grew to its present-day standard.

Jorongmok is the round tube in the middle connecting the left and right side of the hourglass-shaped body. The size of the jorongmok determines the quality of the tone: the wider the tube, the deeper and huskier it sounds; the narrower the tube, the harder and snappier it sounds.

The two skin heads are lapped onto metal hoops placed over the open ends of the body and secured by rope counter-loops. The left head (book side) named gungpyeon is covered with a thick cowhide, horsehide, or deerskin to produce deep and low tones. The right side (chae side) named chaepyeon is covered with either dog skin or a lighter horsehide to produce higher tones.

There are two kinds of beating sticks (chae), namely gungchae and yeolchae. The gungchae is shaped like a mallet with a round head. The handle is made from bamboo root, boiled and straightened out and the head is made from hardwood such as birch or antler. Modern gungchae may also be made from plastic; this variety is normally used by beginning musicians. The yeolchae is always made from bamboo.

== Playing ==
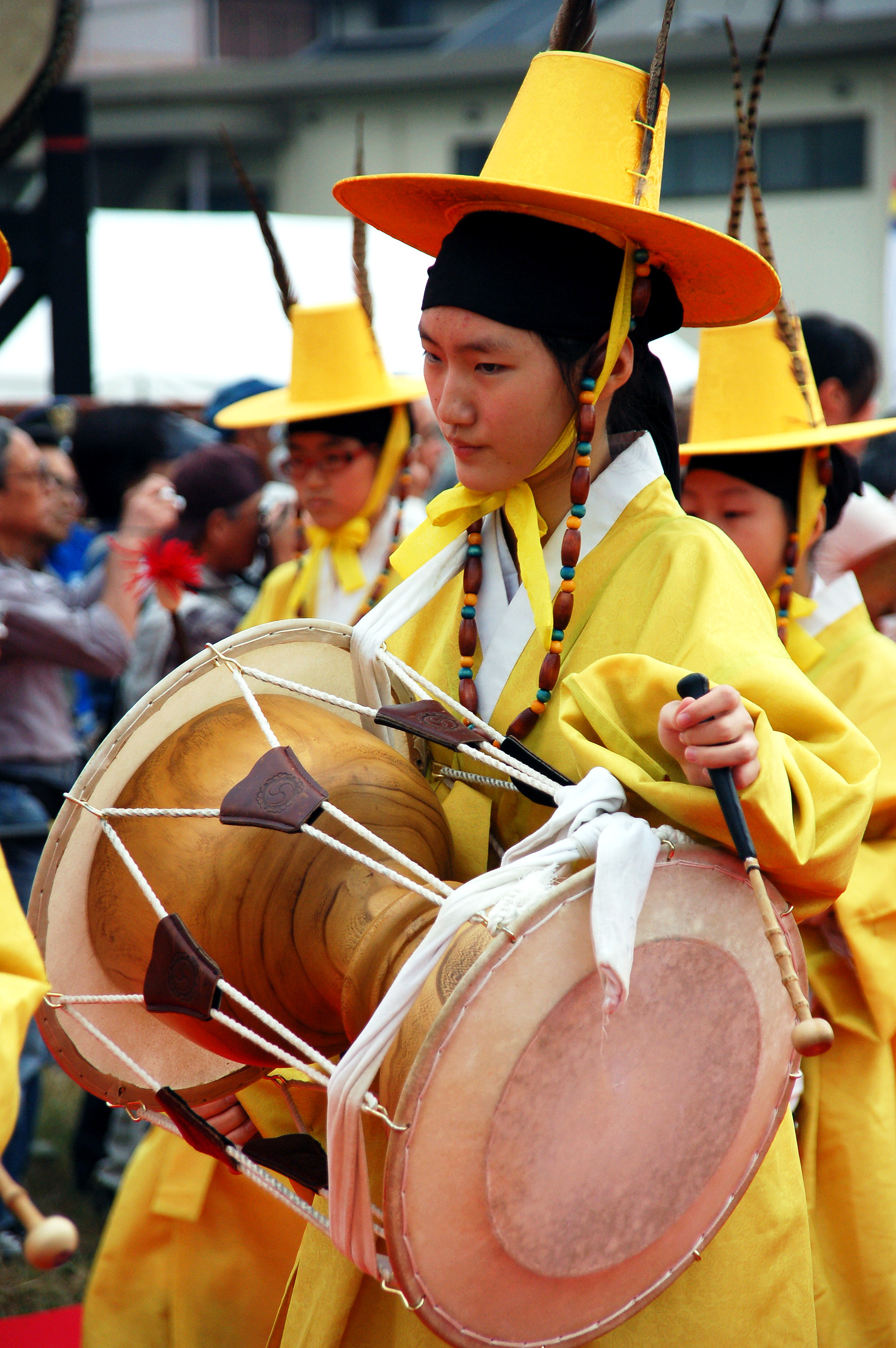
A performer playing janggu

As a result of comparing the oral sounds of the accompaniment janggu and the Samulnori janggu, the basic oral sounds of both accompaniment janggu and Samulnori janggu use the oral sound 'deong', but the basic oral sounds of the chaepyeon playing method are divided into 'deok' and 'ta'. And the gungpyeon technique is also divided into 'kung' and 'gung'.

Janggu is used throughout traditional Korean instrumental music, such as court music, wind music, folk music, and shamanistic music, as well as traditional performing arts divisions such as vocal music and dance and Yeonhui (연희).

Traditionally the janggu is played using yeolchae on the right hand high pitch area and uses the bare hand on the low pitch area. Such an example can be seen on pungmul players for a number of folk songs and shamanistic rituals. But today, it is common to see the use of gungchae and yeolchae together. 'Gungchae' is used to play the low pitch side. With yeolchae, you can make the sound 'tta(따)', and with gungchae sound 'gung(궁)'. When you use it at the same time, you can make the sound 'deong(덩)'. Janggu can be played on the floor such as for traditional sanjo music or carried with a strap on the shoulder. The way performers carry the Janggu differs from person to person, from region to region and varies depending on the player's taste.

The janggu is usually classified as an accompanying instrument because of its flexible nature and its agility with complex rhythms. Since the performer can use their hands as well as sticks, various sounds and tempi, deep and full, soft and tender, and loud sounds, and fast and slow beats, can be created to suit the mood of the audience. Using this ability, a dexterous performer can dance along moving their shoulders up and down to the rhythm.

=== Sound ===
Imsil Pilbong nongak played on the janggu, including the six kinds of chae-gut (채굿)
doen-samchae (된삼채, to play the samchae fast)

Slow gaenjigaeng (느린-갠지갱)

ilchae (일채)

ichae (이채)

samchae (삼채)

sachae (사채)

yukchae (육채)

chilchae (칠채)

== See also ==
- Hourglass drum
- Traditional Korean musical instruments
- Korean music
