= Kkoktugakshi Nori =

Traditional puppet play from Korea

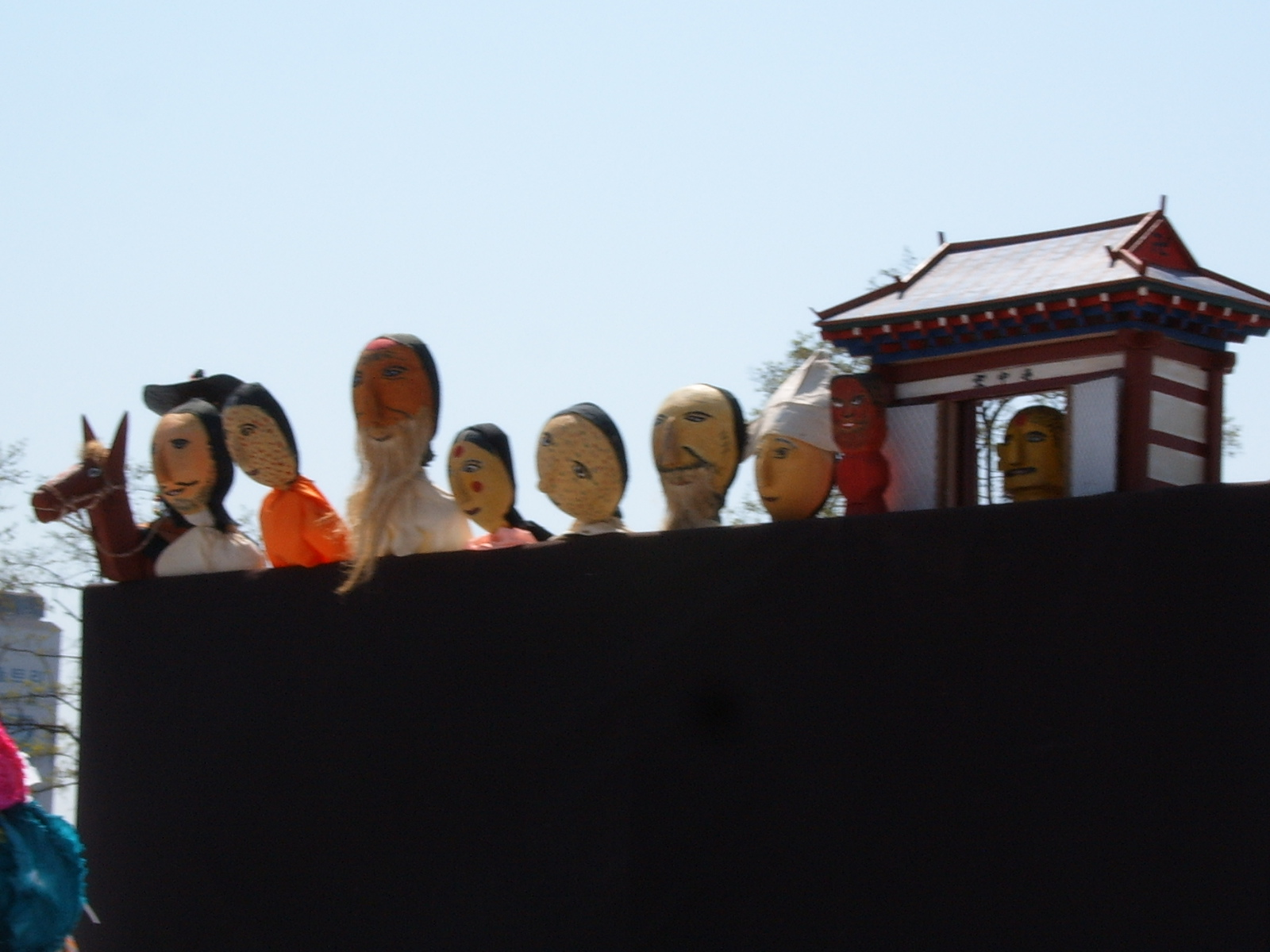
Kkoktugakshi Nori

Kkokdugaksi Noreum (Korean: 꼭두각시놀음) is a traditional puppet theatre, one of the many traditional folk entertainments in Korea. Its origins go as early as the Three Kingdom era in the history of Korea (57 BCE – 668 CE). This puppet play, as it is known today, is inherited from the Joseon era. Kkokdugaksi is often performed by a troupe called Namsadang.

The Namsadang (Korean: 남사당) is a group of male only entertainers traveling around the Korean empire to perform various plays such as Pungmul [Korean: 풍물] (farmers’ band music and dancing), Bona [Korean: 버나] (spinning a bowl on a pole), Salpan [Korean: 살판] (acrobatic acts), Orum [Korean: 어름] (rope walking), Deotboegi [Korean: 덧뵈기] (masked dance), and Kkogdugaksi. Namsadang members were considered homosexuals, thus were treated as outcasts by the educated class due to Korea being a Confucian society. They were part of the lowest class in Joseon society. However, they had no issue with commoners who were also their main audience. The Namsadang troupe was a nomadic community travelling from one village to the other, asking permission from village leaders before entering any village. When they were accepted, they would start performing from about 7pm to 3 or 4am. Their performance would begin with Pungmul (farmers’ band music and dancing) and end with Kkogdugaksi.

The Kkokdugaksi Nori tells the story related to the social life of common people. The performance is bold and satirical with the purpose of mocking the yangban aristocrats, government officials, Buddhist monks, and the social constructs set by the Confucian patriarchy. This satirical energy seems to come from the dismissal of the upper class towards the troupe members. Kkogdugaksi Noreum is also known as Deolmi [Korean: 덜미], Bakcheomji Noreum [Korean: 박 첨지], or Hongdongji Noreum. [Korean: 홍 동지] The names are from the prominent characters of the different episodes called Geori. The show is divided into two acts and seven Geori, according to the repertoire of Master Park Yong-Tae.

== Scenes ==
The first act has four scenes and is centered on the main character Bak Cheomji, relating his life, and showcasing his wife Kkogdu Gaksi, and his concubine Deolmeori-jib. The second act is a satire condemning the cruelty and corrupted reign of the governor of Pyeongan province. It contains three scenes and showcases the character of Hong Dongji, Bak cheomji’s nephew. The play is a combination of music and conversation between Sanbaji (responder) and the puppets. The first scene, Bak Cheomji’s sightseeing, relates the story of Bak Cheomji traveling across all provinces in Korea, watching a Namsadang performance, and boasting about his Hanyang (current Seoul) background. The second scene, Pijori (young women), introduces Bak’s daughter and daughter in law dancing with Buddhist Monks, and Hong Dongji condemning the monks’ hypocrite way of living as they were intended to practice celibacy (out, mina). The third scene titled Kkokdu Gaksi relates Bak Cheomji looking for his wife who left him some years ago. When they found each other, only insults and word play were exchanged as Kkogdu Gaksi discovered that Bak took a concubine. She asked for a divorce and a share of Bak’s wealth, but he did not give her anything valuable. Scene four (Isimi) tells the tale of Isimi, a serpent that devoured Bak’s relatives and villagers. Hong Dongji, Bak’s nephew killed Isimi and saved the village. The fifth scene shares the story of the governor of Pyeongan who visited the village for a falcon hunting game. He hired Hong who won the game but left without sharing any gain with Hong. The sixth scene titled Funeral Bier shares the incident around the death of the governor. Hong Donji volunteers to carry the bier but insults the governor’s son and pushes the bier with his bottom. The puppet theatre ends with the scene title of assembling and disassembling a Buddhist temple. During this scene, a temple is built and disassembled while the audience is invited to make wishes and give money.

== Cultural Heritage ==
Kkokdugaksi is no longer popular as it used to be during the Joseon dynasty. Korean puppet play started fading away during the early twentieth century. Some factors that contributed to its decline were western influence, changes in leisure culture, economic hardship and consequences of the Japanese colonization which considered kkogdugaksi as a threat. During the mid to late twentieth century (1950 - 1988), surviving Namsadang performers began to gather and created the “Folk Theatre Association Namsadang”. Current Namsadang troupes are no longer nomadic. They are more diversified with more female members and have a contemporary style to help current Korean to better understand word plays and the satire since the original theatre were more relevant to the society at the time and the Korean language has evolved. Kkogdugaksi Noreum was nominated as National Intangible Cultural Heritage #3 and later in 2009, the entire performance series of Namsadang troupes, Namsadang Noreum was inscribed on UNESCO’s Intangible Cultural Heritage.

== See also ==
- Talchum
- Namsadang
