= Traditional music of Korea =

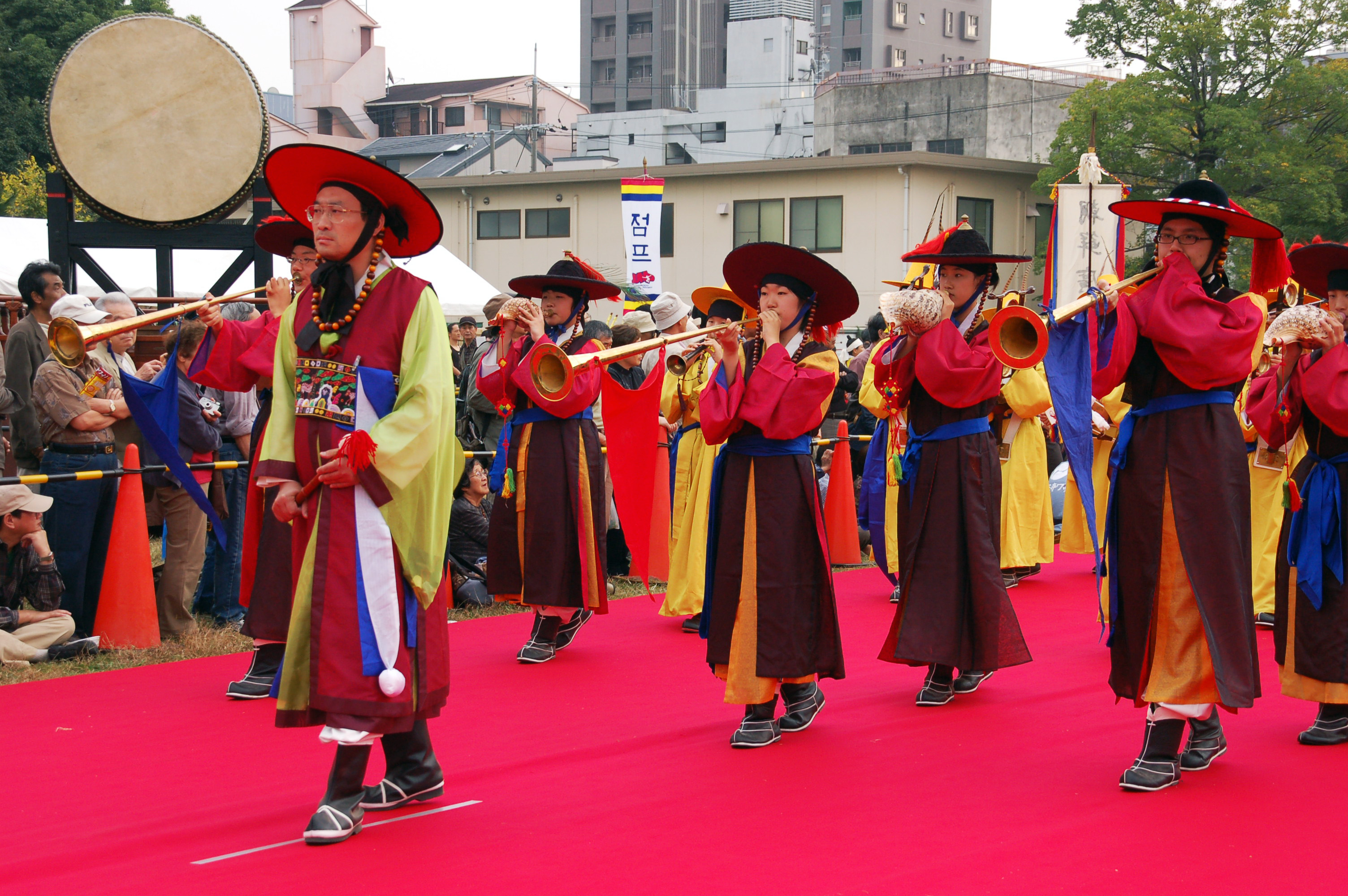
Traditional military music parade (daechwita) in Seoul.

Korea has produced music (Korean: 음악; Hanja: 音樂; RR: eumak; MR: ŭmak) for thousands of years, into the modern day. After the division of Korea in 1945, both North and South Korea have produced their own styles of music.

Traditional music (국악; 國樂; gugak; lit. 'national music') produced by Korea includes court music, folk music, poetic songs, and religious music used in shamanistic and Buddhist traditions.

Modern music includes K-pop (케이팝; keipap), the popular music of South Korea. North Korea also produces its own popular music, as well as music that's inspired by traditional music.

== History ==
=== Proto-Three Kingdoms of Korea ===
Not much is known about music from the Proto-Three Kingdoms of Korea period (before 57 BCE). It is believed that Korean people practiced shamanistic rituals involving music at agricultural festivals. Tomb murals and ceramics from this period depict string instruments with complex features that suggest the instruments were quite developed.

=== Three Kingdoms of Korea ===
The Three Kingdoms of Korea refers to the period from 57 BCE to 668 CE when the Korean peninsula was ruled by three kingdoms: Goguryeo, Baekje, and Silla. Each kingdom was known for favoring different musical instruments.

==== Goguryeo ====
In Goguryeo, an oboe called a piri, a lute called a pipa, and a zither that is still used today called a geomungo were popular instruments. According to the Korean historical record Samguk sagi, written in 1145, the geomungo was invented by prime minister Wang San-ak, who had received a Chinese zither called a guqin as a gift. Wang did not know how to play the guqin so he used it as a model in order to build a new instrument he called the geomungo. A painting of the instrument is found in a tomb in modern-day Jilin Province, China.

The Chinese historical text Records of the Three Kingdoms noted "The people of Goguryeo like to sing and dance. Men and women in villages throughout the country gather every night to sing and dance." Surviving songs from the era include, "Song of the Turtle", and "Song of Nightingales", the latter of which was sung by King Yuri of Goguryeo.

==== Baekje ====
The only song of Baekje conveyed until now is Jeongeupsa (정읍사), but since there are no specific relics such as the mural tombs of Goguryeo, it is quite difficult to grasp what it would be like. It is evident that Baekje also celebrated a harvest festival in May and October similar to that of Goguryeo.

The music of Baekje was known to Liu Song dynasty and Northern Wei, while some music players were invited to Japan. Notably, a man of Baekje named Mimaji (미마지) learned music and dance in China and emigrated to Japan in 612.

==== Silla ====
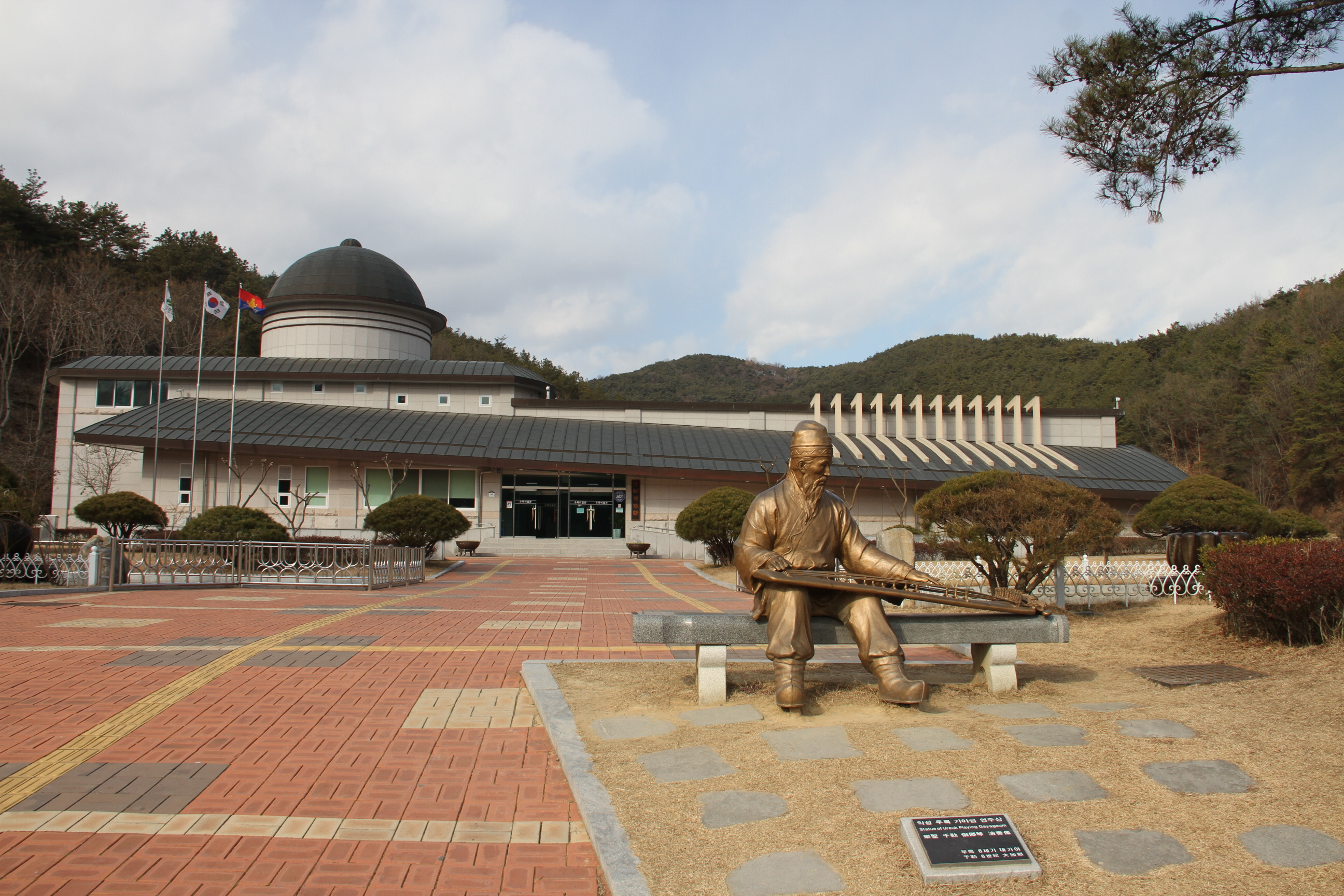
The museum of Ureuk in Goryeong, Gyeongssangbuk-do where it demonstrates the development of music in Gaya and Silla.

Before Silla unified three kingdoms, the music of Silla is represented by a traditional instrument, gayageum which was said that Ureuk from Gaya brought it in the reign of King Jinheung when his kingdoms were incorporated by Silla forces. Although Samguk sagi conveys 12 names of compositions Ureuk did, those are not fully inherited. In the 13th year of Jinheung, Ureuk taught gayageum, songs, and dances to three disciples of Gyego, Beopji y Mandeok.

Later the famed scholar, Ch'oe Ch'i-wŏn who studied in Tang dynasty away from bone rank system of Silla chartered five poems of hyangak (The local music) which depict performing arts in Silla toward the end of its era. These figures are found in history books, Goryeosa as a court ballet performance consisting of hyangak and dangak in subcategories of Korean music.

=== North and South States period ===
==== Unified Silla ====
After unification, the music of Silla experienced the influx of diverse music from Baekje and Goguryeo with the wider development of hyangak, especially in gayageum, geomungo, bipa of three string instruments and other three pipes. Additionally, music from the Tang dynasty was introduced under the reign of King Munmu. The Buddhist chant, Beompae (hangul 범패, hanja 梵唄) was widely adopted with variety of instruments, forming a unique art of Silla. During unified Silla, the royal institute of music (en hangul: 음성서) was established.

=== Goryeo dynasty ===
Taejo of Goryeo, the founder of Goryeo followed several customs of Silla which can be found in a series of Buddhist celebrations such as Palgwanhoe and Yeondeunghoe. However, the influence of Silla dramatically diminished in the middle of its period owing to the influx of music from Song, establishing a strong influence on Korean court music. A large banquet where performances handed down from Silla such as the sword dance was conducted. Most of Goryeo songs were recorded in Akhak gwebeom after the 15th century of which features were the lyrics of the Korean language, different from those of previous eras.

Goryeo court dance named jeongjae can be divided into two categories: native dances of hyangak jeongjae (향악정재); Tang-derived dangak jeongjae (당악정재). Additionally, folk dances were practiced by monks and shamans.

=== Joseon dynasty ===
As Yi Sŏnggye founded Joseon in 1392, the dynasty adopted anti-Buddhism and pro-Confucianism which affected the musical pattern of Yeak (예악; 禮樂). Although some scholars like Chŏng Tojŏn made several songs for celebrating the initial moments of Joseon, the notation followed the trends of Goryeo.

Joseon periods saw considerable developments of its music during the reign of Sejong which were largely attributable to a musician Park Yeon. Park firstly established an independent organ of music and created Korean-style notation including Jeonganbo (en Hangul: 정간보). King Sejong himself also composed songs. A son of Sejong, Sejo who killed his nephew, Danjong also recorded his score in pitch pipe notation. The two kings above are the only rulers whose musical records are now traceable.

Music and dance enjoyed favorable positions in the court banquets and also within the elite yangban class. The feasts hosted by high-rank officers involved several entertainers like clowns and acrobats. After the middle of its period, what-so-called middlemen (중인, Jungin) came to play diverse instruments mixing lyric poems and long cyclical songs.

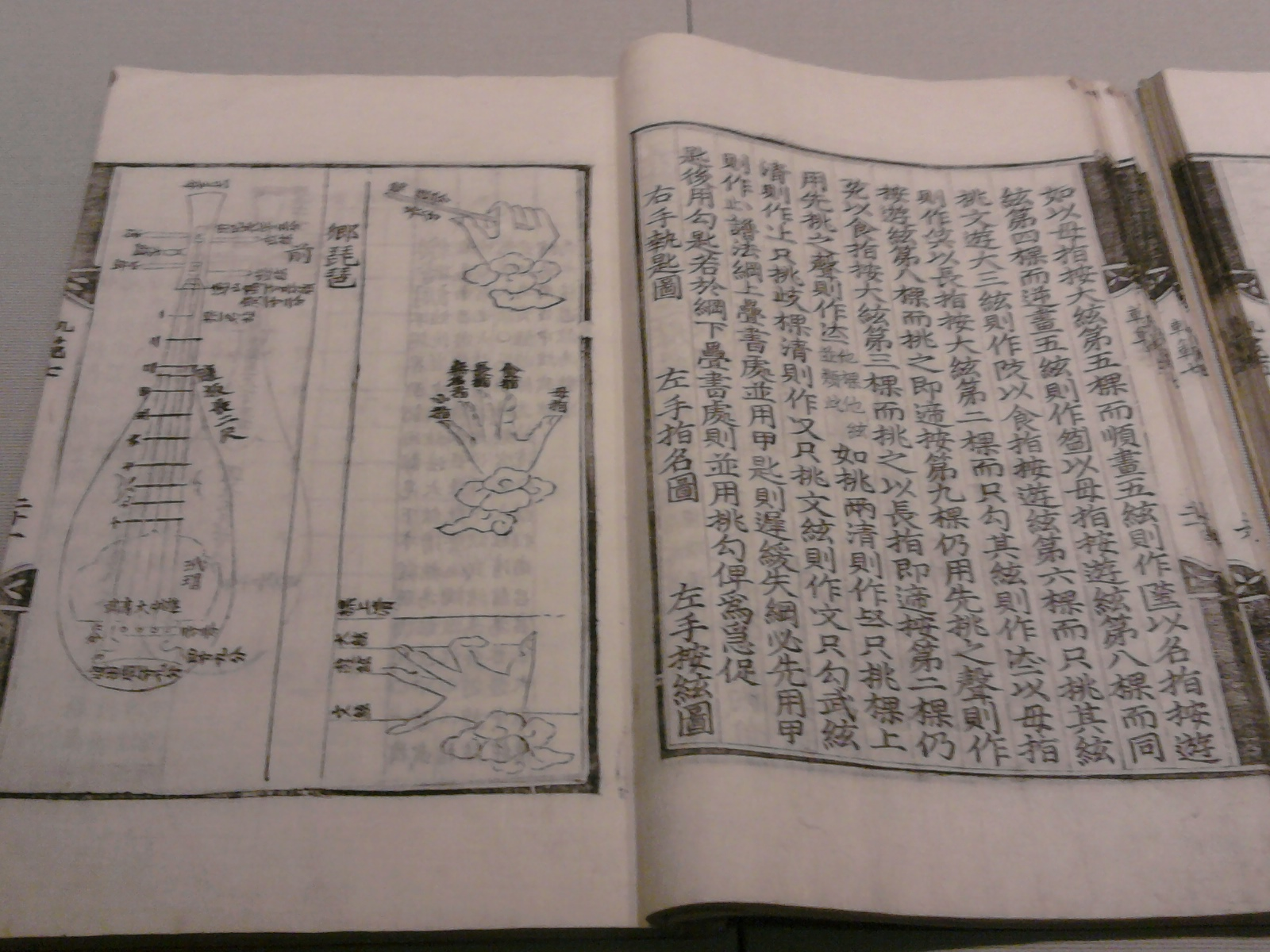
A page of "Akhakgwebeom".

The process of compiling traditional Korean music continued until the reign of Seongjong with the publication of the first independent musical text Akhakgwebeom.

Because of two damaging wars, the culture of Joseon went through a series of hardships which resulted in the loss of instrumental music and songs in court and also a royal shrine. The musical situation in the late Joseon can be described as declining contrary to its expansion period.

Ancestor worship ceremonies called Munmyo jerye and Jongmyo jerye were revived and performed annually, chiefly to commemorate the deaths of Confucian scholars and Korean kings.

The public enjoyed the genre of pansori, sanjo and namsadang-nori. Pansori first emerged as a common culture in the mid-Joseon. Although it is hard to grasp exact points of its evolution, the oral tradition of this genre came to be followed by musical experts only to expand its sphere not only to commoners but also to aristocrats.

In 1894, Joseon government dispatched ten court musicians to Boston Exposition in the United States to build an independent foundation.

=== After Korean Empire ===
Joseon was transformed into the Korean Empire with a view to organizing its sphere out of the external interruption, while the rituals of empires were revived and practiced Confucian court music to celebrate the expansion of the nation. However, the Japanese colonization of Korea in 1910 brought tremendous change inside and outside Korea with an influence of western music. After the collapse, Korean court music found almost no way to make celebrations and rituals, which was replaced with marching songs. Instead of pansori and gagok, the musical trends were largely changed into modern-style performances and classical music. Followed by cultural suppression in the 1920s, Korean traditional music barely survived.

During the 1930s, despite suppression of folk music, there was some support for some singers. In January 1934 Wang Su-bok was featured in the first live Korean language radio broadcast to Japan. The transmission was organised by the Japanese Broadcasting Corporation, and she was accompanied by Kyongsong Broadcasting Orchestra.

== Korean voice (sori/chang) ==
Changbu Taryeong
Changbu Taryeong is a minyo (folk song) of the Gyeonggi Province region of Korea.

Sae Taryeong
Sae Taryeong is a minyo (folk song) of the Jeolla Province region of Korea.

Doraji Taryeong
Doraji Taryeong is a minyo (folk song) of the Hwanghae Province region of Korea.

Gunbam Taryeong
Gunbam Taryeong is a minyo (folk song) of the Gyeonggi Province region of Korea.

Korean folk song or minyo, is varied and complex, but all forms maintain a set of rhythms (called 장단; Jangdan) and a loosely defined set of melodic modes owing to diverse instruments, while even drums were eligible to demonstrate a variety of rhythmic cycles.

Because the folk songs of various areas are categorized under Dongbu folk songs, their vocal styles and modes are limited. Therefore, currently, scholars are attempting to categorize the Dongbu folk songs further, based on different musical features. These songs are primarily simple and bright. Namdo folk songs are those of Jeolla Province and a part of Chungcheong Province. While the folk songs of other regions are mostly musically simple, the folk songs of the Namdo region, where the famous musical genres pansori and sanjo were created, are rich and dramatic. Some Namdo folk songs are used in pansori or developed by professional singers and are included as part of their repertoires. Jeju folk songs are sung on Jeju Island. Jeju folk songs are more abundant in number than any other regional folk songs, and approximately 1600 songs are transmitted today. Jeju folk songs are characterized by their simple and unique melodic lines and rich texts.

=== Pansori ===
Pansori (판소리) is a long vocal and percussive music played by one singer and 1 drummer. In this traditional art form, sometimes rather misleadingly called 'Korean Opera', a narrator may play the parts of all the characters in a story, accompanied by a drummer. The lyrics tell one of five different stories but are individualized by each performer, often with updated jokes and audience participation. One of the most famous pansori singers is Park Dongjin (박동진). In 2003, Pansori was designated as intangible cultural property in UNESCO's Memory of the world.

The National Theatre of Korea provides monthly opportunities to experience traditional Korean narrative songs or Pansori.

=== Pungmul ===
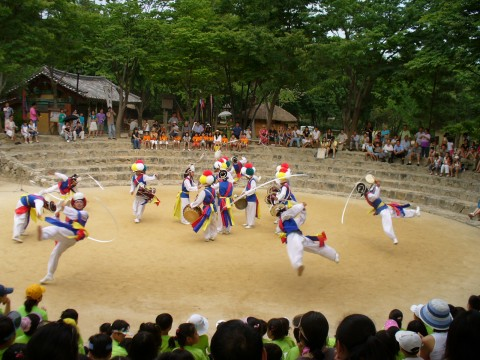
Pungmul

Pungmul (풍물) is a Korean folk music tradition that is a form of percussion music that includes drumming, dancing, and singing. Most performances are outside, with dozens of players, all in constant motion. Samul Nori, originally the name of a musical group founded in 1978, has become popular as a genre, even overseas. It is based on Pungmul musical rhythmic patterns and uses the same instruments, but is faster and usually played while sitting down.

=== Sanjo ===
Sanjo (산조) is played without a pause in faster tempos as one of the most popular genres of traditional Korean music. It is entirely instrumental music, and includes changes in rhythmic and melodic modes during individual work. The tempo increases in each movement. The general style of the sanjo is marked by slides in slow movements and rhythmic complexity in faster movements. Instruments include the changgo drum set against a melodic instrument, such as the gayageum or ajaeng. Famous practitioners include such names as Kim Chukp'a, Yi Saenggang and Hwang Byungki. Notably, Hwang established a new type of sanjo genre that involved in the repertory of gayageum on the basis of aiming to identify and explain distinctive musical features and creativity.

=== Jeongak ===
Jeongak (정악; 正樂) or Chongak means literally "right (or proper) music", and its tradition includes both instrumental and vocal music, which were cultivated mainly by the upper-class literati of the Joseon society. The instrumental branch has several versions of a lengthy chamber, chiefly Yongsan hoesang, while the vocal branch sometimes include the meaning of jeongga (Right Song) with a wide range of gagok, gasa, and sijo.

Although jeongak has things in common with court music but it cannot be categorized as popular song since most public would never hear of these melodies by incorporating various court dances. Vocals performed in jeongak are normally sung in a style of kagok (가곡), which is for mixed male and female singers and is accompanied by a variety of instruments. The best-known piece of jeongak is Yeongsan hoesang of 9 suites which has now had only instrumental notes.

=== Nongak ===
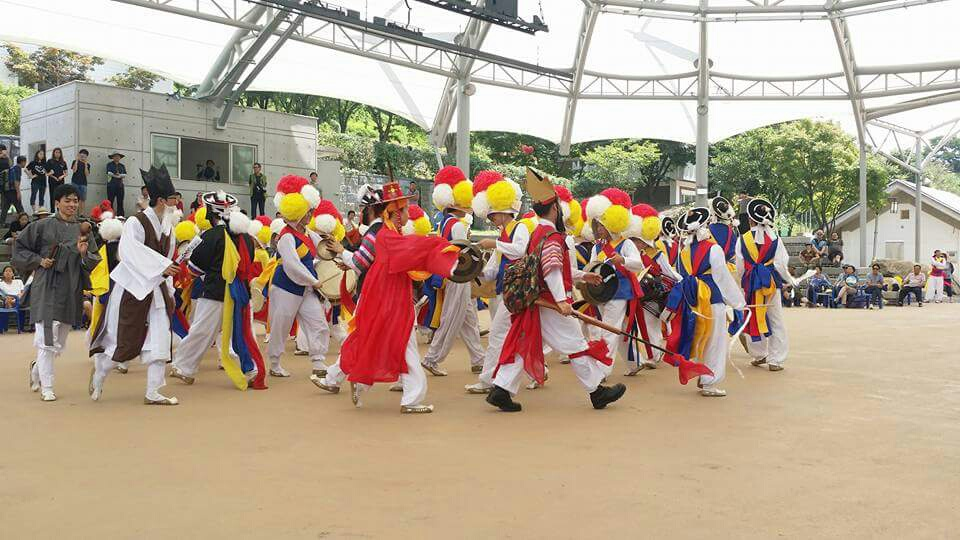
Nongak parade of several players.

Nongak (농악) refers to "farmers' music" and represents an important musical genre which has been developed mainly by peasants in the agricultural society of Korea. The farmers' music is performed typically in an open area of the village. The organization of nongak varies according to locality and performing groups, and today there are a great number of regional styles and involvement of many instruments. Since Nongak involves in many types of dances and formation changes, the dancers and players have several types of artistic format due to their level of skill.

=== Shinawi ===
Shinawi or Sinawi (시나위), means, in the broadest sense, the shamanistic music of Korea which is performed during a Korean shaman's ritual dance performance to console and to entertain deities mainly from Korea's southwest region. In this sense of the word, the term is almost identical with another term, shinbanggok (lit. 'spirit chamber music'), which indicated general shamanistic music performed at a folk religious ceremony known as kut. The format of this genre is comparatively loose with several dancers being united and dispersed on the stage.

=== Salpuri ===
Salpuri dance (살풀이춤) is a shamanistic ritual dance, conducted as exorcism of bad ghosts. The style of this ritual dance is characterized simple and serene. The long scarf with fluid lines express long lines of the arms and fingers of the dancer from corner to corner of the space, utilizing the vastness of space all the way.

== Court music ==
Korean court music preserved to date can be traced to the beginning of the Joseon period in 1392. It is now rare, except for government-sponsored organizations like The National Center for Korean Traditional Performing Arts.

There are three types of court music.

- Aak is an imported form of Chinese ritual music.
- Hyang-ak is a Pure Korean form.
- Dang-ak is a combination of Korean and Chinese influences.

=== Aak ===
The word Aak is the Korean pronunciation of two hanja characters, which indicate the equivalent form of yayue in Chinese and gagaku in Japan. Since Confucius used this term to distinguish elegant and beneficial music from the melodies without harmony, it enjoyed favorable status during Joseon. Derived from wider types of notations, Korea has maintained its melodies until now of which features were long lost in China. Aak is considered a special type of court music in specific ritual ceremonies at very rare concerts, such as the Sacrifice to Confucius in Seoul.

=== Dang-ak ===
Dangak or Tangak refers to the music which came from the Tang dynasty. The instruments from Tang were imported. During the 12th century, Korea received musical instruments as gifts from the Chinese ruler, which were used by the orchestra at Confucian rituals. These influences provided Unified Silla with robust opportunities to develop its music culture after Korean performers' visits to China and vice versa Chinese performers visited Korea in 1116.

=== Hyang-ak ===
Hyangak literally means The local music or Music native to Korea of which one example is Sujecheon, a piece of instrumental music as old as 1,300 years. Hyangak firstly appeared as early as during Silla period with four ensemble stringed instrument with woodwind instruments similar to the oboe, called a piri. Pares and English indicate the texts of Goryeosa: The most significant dates for music hyangak (indigenous music; other texts refer to this as sogak) were 1114 and 1116, when the court received two gifts from the eighth Song emperor, Huizong. Korea was fast becoming a Confucian state and kings had begun to observe Confucian rites to heaven, to agriculture, land and grain, and to royal ancestors.

Yongbieocheonga, Songs of the Dragons Flying to Heaven represents its uniqueness as hyangak, which was originally tuned to various notes and lyrics but the text was lost and purely instrument rhythm left.

== Traditional instruments ==
Traditional Korean instruments can be broadly divided into three groups:

1. String
2. Wind
3. Percussion

Percussion folk instruments include jing (large hanging gong), kkwaenggwari (hand-held gong), buk (barrel drum), janggu (hourglass drum). Percussion court includes the pyeongjong (bronze bells), pyeongyeong (stone chimes), chuk (square wooden box with mallet) and eo (tiger-shaped scraper).

== See also ==
- K-pop
- Music of South Korea
- Music of North Korea
- List of South Korean musicians
- List of North Korean musicians
