= Samul nori =

Genre of percussion music from Korea

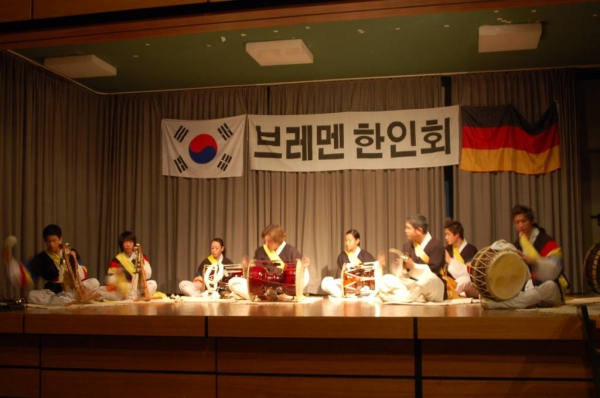
- A samul nori performance in Bremen, Germany
- Native name: 사물놀이
- Stylistic origins: Pungmul; muak
- Cultural origins: Late 1970s – early 1980s, South Korea
- Typical instruments: Janggu; buk; jing; kkwaenggwari

- Samul nori
- Hangul: 사물놀이
- Hanja: 四物놀이
- RR: samullori
- MR: samullori

Samul nori (Korean: 사물놀이; lit. 'four objects play') is a genre of Korean percussion music. It is a modern adaptation of traditional Korean musics, namely the ritual farming music nongak and Korean shamanic music muak, for the indoor stage.

As per its name, samul nori is performed with four traditional Korean musical instruments: a small gong kkwaenggwari, the larger gong jing, an hourglass-shaped drum janggu; and a barrel drum called buk.

With dozens of professional and amateur groups, samul nori has been called "Korea’s most successful traditional music".

== History ==
The term samul originally comes from Korean Buddhism, where it referred to four instruments considered essential for ritual use in temples: the wooden fish (목어; 木魚; mogeo), the temple bell (범종; 梵鐘; beomjong), the dharma drum (법고; 法鼓; beopgo), and the bronze gong (운판; 雲板; umpan). The term nori means "to play" in Korean.

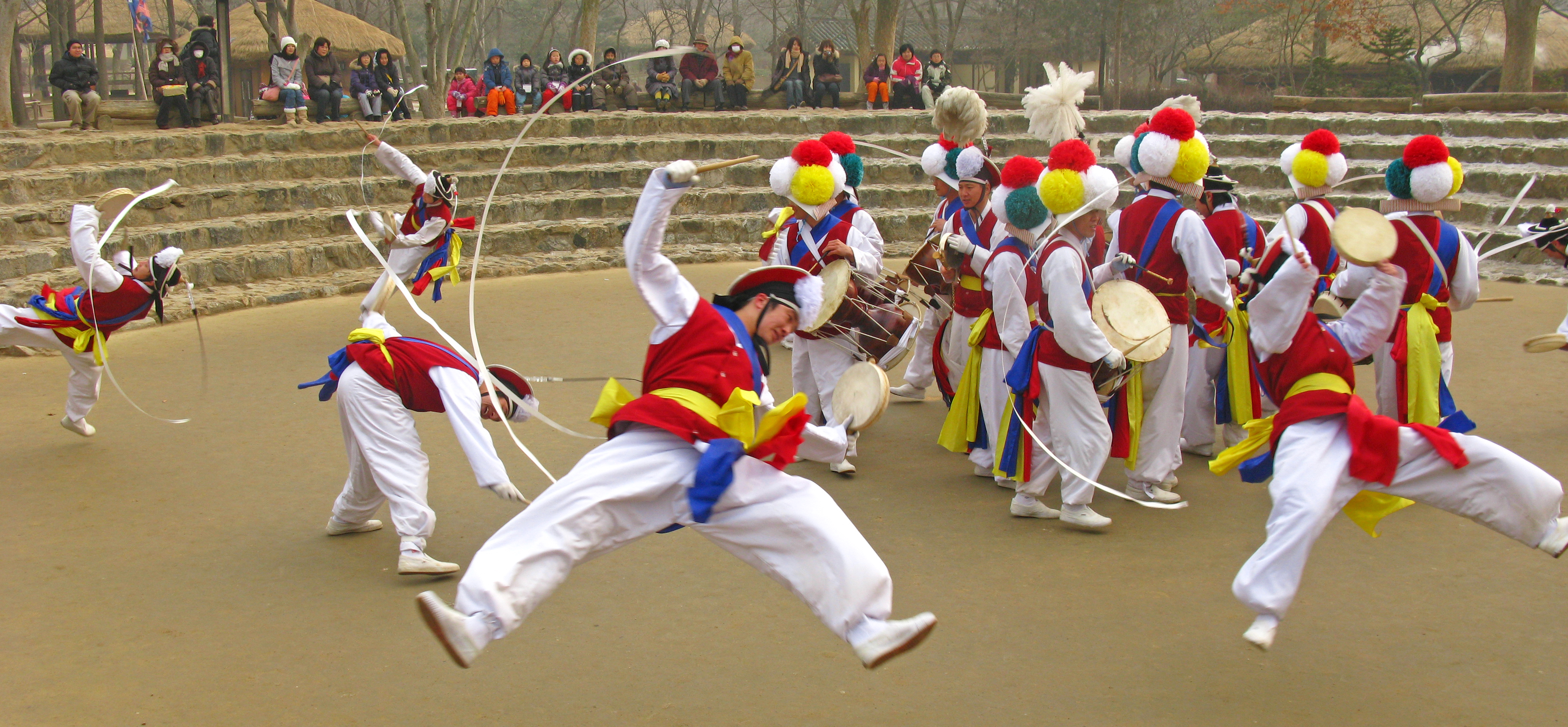
A traditional pungmul performance (2009)

Samul nori is a modern adaptation of the traditional ritual music of Korean farmers, called nongak or pungmul nori, for the stage. Traditionally, such music involved elaborate costumed dances and was performed outdoors; in samul nori, emphasis is placed on the music and musicians, who are seated while performing.

In a later interview, Kim Duk-soo (김덕수), the founder and artistic director of the group, claimed that the choice to adapt traditional music to indoor venues was due to political circumstances at the time. The late 1970s saw the last years of the rule of South Korean president Park Chung Hee. During that time, large public gatherings were restricted, and Korean traditional music was associated with the student protest movement. Public performers were subject to arrest.

The first ever samul nori performance was on February 22, 1978, in a small theater in Seoul. Its original performers included Kim Duk-soo, Kim Yong-bae (김용배), Choe Jong-seok (최종석), and Choe Tae-hyeon (최태현). This group has since been dubbed the Original SamulNori Group (원사물놀이패), and a descendant of this group still performs today as SamulNori Hanulim (한울림예술단). Initially, samul nori failed to gain acceptance from traditional Korean musicians; among others, South Korean musicologist Alan Heyman questioned the genre's link to traditional local bands. Ethnomusicologist Keith Howard noted, "Older musicians saw in the quartet a challenge to what they knew, hence SamulNori was destined to struggle for acceptance from them."

However, samul nori soon gained popularity both nationally, especially among the urban youth, and globally, with the original quartet being invited to perform in Tokyo and at the opening of Disney World Resort’s Epcot Centre in Florida in 1982. In 1984, Kim Yong-bae brought samul nori to the South Korean National Gugak Center. In 1985, the group began touring in Europe. Over the following decades, a number of professor and amateur groups developed around the genre. There are now also a number of other unrelated samul nori troupes, some with their own significant styles. By the 21st-century, samul nori was incorporated into some South Korean public school curriculums, particularly around the middle school level. Internationally, samul nori has found footing as long-standing student organizations at universities such as Washington University in St. Louis.

The original samul nori quartet disbanded in 1993, as a result of internal conflicts, burnout, and financial issues. The same year, however, Kim founded a large samul nori orchestra called "Hanullim" (Korean: 한울림). The orchestra seeks to promote samul nori performance.

== Influences ==
The music of samul nori is heavily based on pungmul nori music, particularly the namsadang style. The link to namsadang is because the founders of the genre were heavily based in that style themselves, having come from families and being taught by teachers involved in the genre. For example, Kim Yong-bae's teacher and Kim Duk-soo's father, both practitioners of namsadang, were heavily involved in samul nori's creation. They and several others traveled South Korea and gathered traditional farming melodies for use in samul nori, drawing particular inspiration from the melodies of Gyeonggi Province, Chungcheong Province, the Honam region, and of Jinju samcheonpo nongak. They took continual feedback from their research, and gradually incorporated melodies and ideas from them into their set over time.

There are, however, several differences between the original pungmul and samul nori. Samul nori is usually performed sitting down, whereas pungmul nori often incorporates dances into their performances. Additionally, while pungmul nori is usually led by the kkwaenggwari player, samul nori instead hinges on the rhythm of the janggu player.

The original group also incorporated other types of traditional Korean music, including muak: music of the Korean shamanic rituals called gut. To this end, they collaborated with Korean shamans from around South Korea, and even trained with them in camps in order to learn the music.

The concept of dualism, particularly through the lens of yin and yang, is considered important to samul nori. The genre's instruments and their uses are interpreted in various ways using this theme.

== Notable repertoire ==
The Yeongnam nongak (영남 농악) composition is often the first piece learned by amateurs, with ethnomusicologist Katherine In-Young Lee describing it as the most accessible. Lee wrote that the piece was "likely the most performed samul nori composition by amateur ensembles within and outside South Korea". The piece adapts and arranges existing pungmul rhythmic patterns from the Yeongnam region in Korea. Yeongnam nongak is generally composed of six distinct rhythmic sections: gilgunak (길군악; lit. 'road military music'), bangilunak (반길군악; lit. 'half road military music'), dadeuraegi (다드래기), yeongsan dadeuraegi (영산 다드래기), yeongyulchae (연결채), byeoldalgeori (별달거리; lit. 'bright moon scene'), ssangjinpuri (쌍진풀이), and maeji (맺이, derived from the verb maetda (맺다), meaning "closure"). During byeoldalgeori, performers shout a chant, one of the few spoken parts in samul nori repertoire.
