= Geomungo =

Chordophonic instrument from Korea

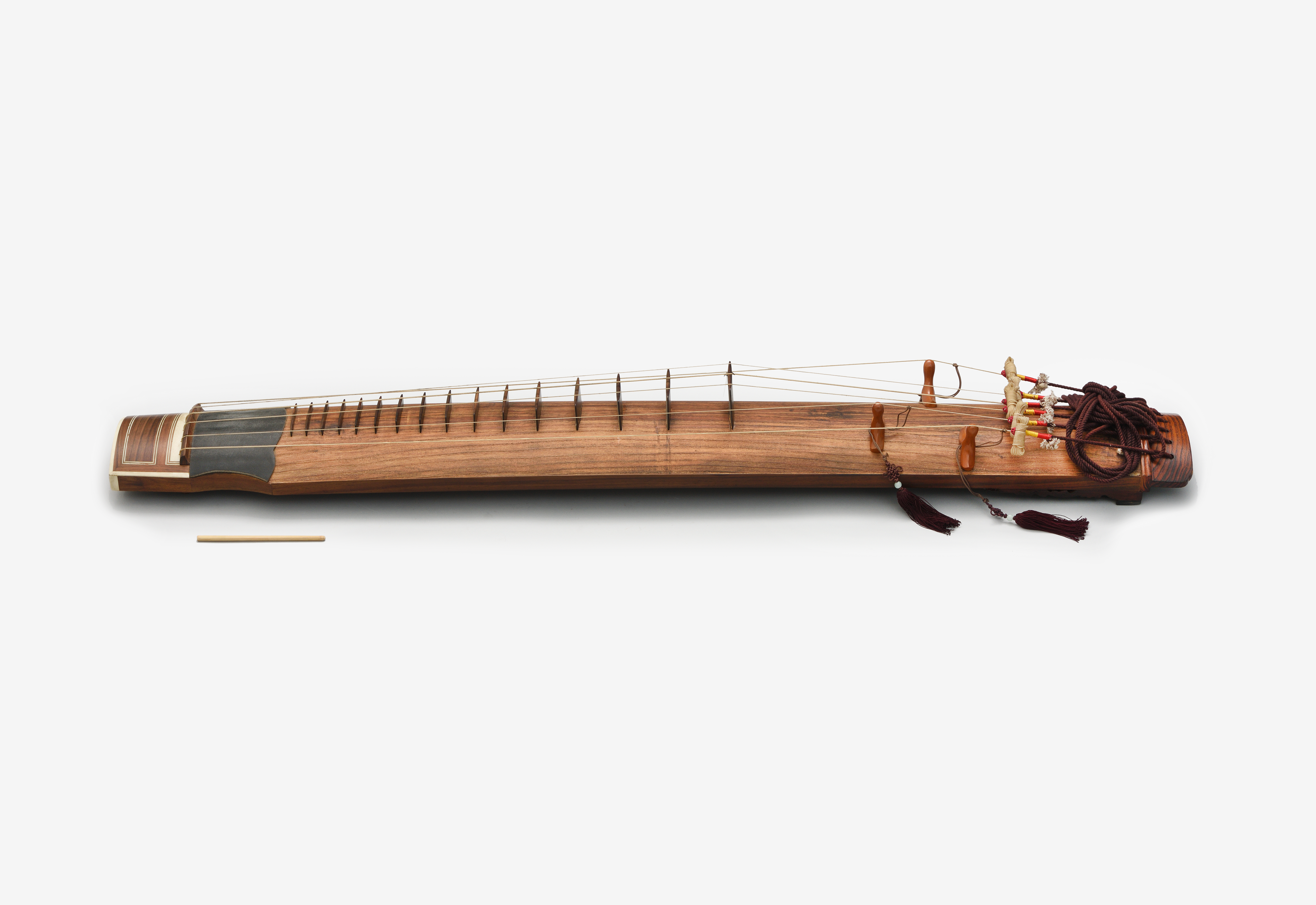

Korean name
- Hangul: 거문고
- RR: geomungo
- MR: kŏmun'go

Alternate name
- Hangul: 현금
- Hanja: 玄琴
- RR: hyeongeum
- MR: hyŏn'gŭm

The geomungo, (Note: Korean: 거문고; MR: kŏmun'go; also spelled komungo.) alternate name hyeongeum, (Note: 현금; hyŏn'gŭm; 'black zither'; also spelled hyongum.) is a traditional Korean plucked zither with both bridges and frets. Geomungo is a representative stringed instrument made in Goguryeo before the 5th century. Scholars believe that the name refers to Goguryeo and translates to "Goguryeo zither" or that it refers to the colour and translates to "black crane zither" (현학금; 玄鶴琴; hyeonhakgeum).

The geomungo's place in Korean culture is traditionally that of a scholars' instrument for self-cultivation, much like ancient Chinese had done with the guqin in China. However, the Koreans never adopted the guqin as a folk instrument but instead inherited the Confucian and literati guqin lore wholesale and applied it onto their own geomungo lore.

== History ==
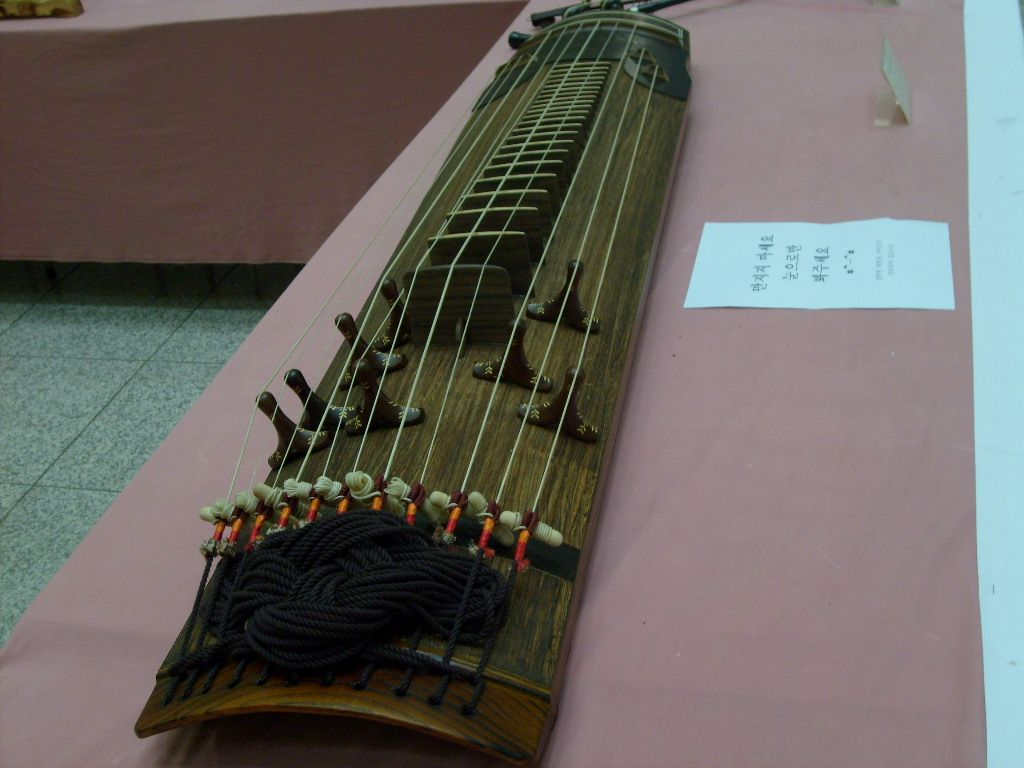
An 11-stringed modern geomungo

The geomungo originated circa the 4th century (see Anak Tomb No.3 infra) through the 7th century from the kingdom of Goguryeo, the northernmost of the Three Kingdoms of Korea, although the instrument can be traced back to the 4th century.

According to the 1145 historical text Samguk sagi, the geomungo was invented in the 6th century by prime minister Wang San-ak by remodeling the form of the ancient Chinese instrument guqin (gogeum, also called chilhyeongeum, literally "seven-string zither"). After his death, the instrument was passed down to Ok Bogo, Son Myeong-deuk, Gwi Geum, An Jang, Cheong Jang, and Geuk Jong, while being widely spread over the kingdom. However, National Gugak Center of Korea raises the possibility that the geomungo originated from a traditional musical instrument of Goguryeo before Guqin was introduced. Meanwhile, Japanese scholars claim that the predecessor of geomungo was the wo konghou (卧箜篌), a fretted bridge zither that was used in China since at least the Western Han Dynasty, and opinion about predecessor of Geomungo is still discussed among East Asian Scholars. Archetype of the instrument is painted in Goguryeo tombs. They are found in the tomb of Muyongchong and Anak Tomb No.3.

== Construction ==
The geomungo is approximately 162 cm long and 23 cm wide (63.75 inches long, 9 inches wide), and has movable bridges called anjok (雁足 "goose feet") and 16 frets called gwae (棵; numbered 1 to 16 from left to right). It has a hollow body where the front plate of the instrument is made of paulownia wood and the back plate is made of hard chestnut wood. Its six strings, which are made of twisted silk passed through its back plate. The pick is made from bamboo sticks in the size of regular household pencil. Near the bridge is a leather-covered section called daemo to protect the surface from the striking of the suldae stick.

The six strings are named (from closest one to the player outward) munhyeon (文弦 "civil string"), yuhyeon (遊弦 "roaming string"), daehyeon (大弦 "big string"), gwaesangcheong (棵上清 "clarity upon the frets"), gwaehacheong (棵下清 "clarity below the frets"), and muhyeon (武弦 "martial string"), and are numbered 1 to 6 respectively in notation (or 文、方、大、上、中、下 in tablature form). Strings 2 to 4 go over fret 1 and are positioned over the frets whilst 1, 5, and 6 are supported by the anjok bridges. Strings 2 and 3 are used to play stopped notes and the rest are played open or as drones (even string 4 which is above the frets, though it is sometimes played stopped in some pieces). The thickness of the strings are not sequential: usually the thickest string is the daehyeon, followed by the munhyeon and muhyeon. The yuhyeo is usually the thinnest string followed by the gwaesangcheong and gwaehacheong, though some have the gwaesangcheong as the thinnest followed by the yuhyeon.

Modernized geomungo increases the strings to 11, which are made of nylon. As with the traditional version, three strings are over the frets and the others are all open. But the traditional version of the geomungo has 6 strings, with three over the frets.

Recently, the 6-string geomungo has been modified quite a lot, with the appearance of electronic geomungo (전자 거문고). The instrument has been played with a hwaldae bow (활대 거문고), similar to playing the ajaeng), and some versions have more strings. The Chinese wo konghou has 7 strings while the traditional geomungo only has 6 strings.

In the development of culture, besides the conservation artists, inheriting the cultural tradition of the nation, there are artists who change and modernize the traditional culture of the nation.

== Playing method ==
The geomungo is generally played while seated on the floor. The strings are plucked with a short bamboo stick plectrum called suldae (술대/匙), which is held between the index and middle fingers of the right hand, while the left-hand presses on the strings (mostly 2 and 3) by either pulling or pushing to produce various pitches using the thumb and first four fingers. The left-hand ring-finger usually wears a leather thimble (called golmu) to act as support as the strings are high above the frets and are difficult to press down firmly on the frets. The player can use the stick to strike the daemo leather protector during plucks to create percussive effects.

The most typical tuning of the open strings for the playing of traditional Korean court music is (from string closest to the player outwards) Eb, Ab, Db, Bb, Bb, and Bb an octave lower than the central tone. For sanjo and folk music, the Eb string is raised to F (plus all the strings might be raised a major 2nd up). The instrument is played in traditional Korean court music and the folk styles of sanjo and sinawi.

Due to its characteristically percussive sound and vigorous playing technique it is thought of as a more "masculine" instrument than the 12-string or 24 string gayageum (another Korean zither); both instruments, however, are played by both male and female performers.

The geomungo has a large range of playable songs and also has a large range of tunes.

The geomungo historically had a notation tablature system similar to that of the guqin Chinese seven-stringed zither jianzipu system, but this has been superseded by modern staff notation.

The Korean-born, U.S. resident geomungo performer and composer Jin Hi Kim plays a custom-made electric geomungo in addition to the regular instrument.

A geomungo was featured in Korean K-pop group Blackpink's music video "Pink Venom", played by Jisoo at the start of the video.

== See also ==
- Korean music
- Traditional Korean musical instruments
