= Kkwaenggwari =

Small, flat Korean traditional gong

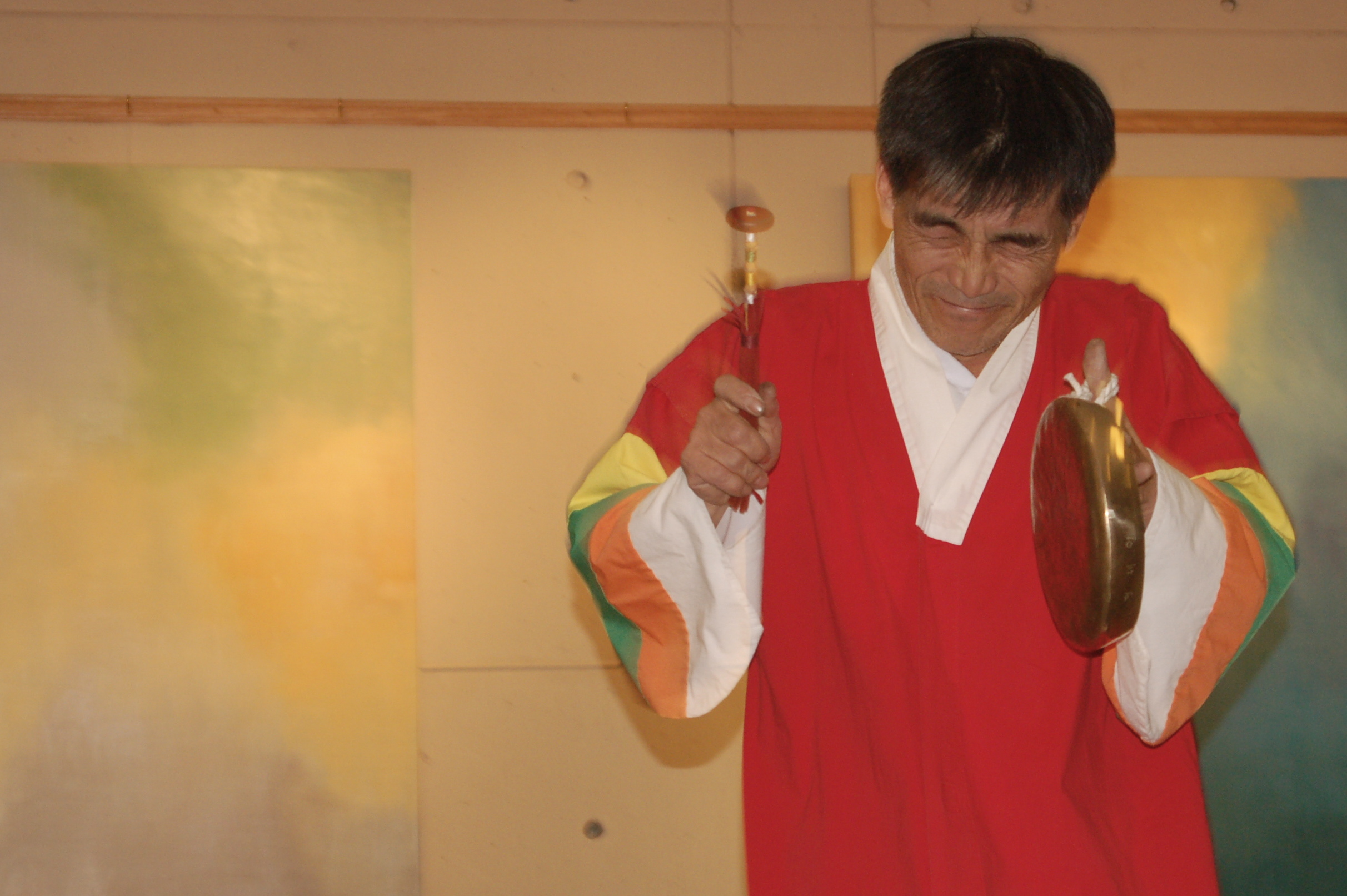
- A person playing a kkwaenggwari

Percussion instrument
- Classification: Gong

Sound sample
- Whimori

- Kkwaenggwari
- Hangul: 꽹과리
- RR: kkwaenggwari
- MR: kkwaenggwari

The kkwaenggwari (Korean: 꽹과리; Korean pronunciation: [k͈wɛŋ.gwa.ɾi]) is a small flat gong used in traditional Korean music. It is made of brass and is played with a hard stick. It produces a distinctively high-pitched, metallic tone that breaks into a cymbal-like crashing timbre when struck forcefully.

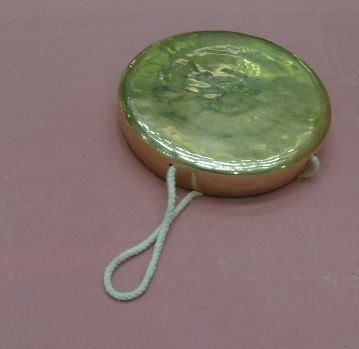
A kkwaenggwari

It is particularly important in samul nori and pungmul, although it is also used in other genres such as Korean shamanic music.

This gong is struck with a wooden mallet to produce a sharp, attention commanding sound. The instrument is commonly used in folk performing arts in Korea, including shamanic music, dance, and mask dance drama, and is the lead instrument in pungmul.

In Nongak, the person who beats a kkwaenggwari is called Sangsoe (상쇠) or Busoe (부쇠). Sangsoe is responsible for directing the entire flow.

== Structure ==
The front of the kkwaenggwari is a brass plate with a diameter of around 20 cm (7.9 in). The back of the kkwaenggwari is an open plate and is blocked with the left hand to control the volume and tone of the kkwaenggwari.

Players hold a string attached to the instrument. The thumb of the left hand is placed on the hook and the rest of the fingers inside the border behind the kkwaenggwari ring plate, with the tip of the index finger supporting the inside of the edge.

The stick of the kkwaenggwari is generally made of hard wood, such as that of trifoliate trees.
