= Gut (ritual) =

Korean shamanic rite

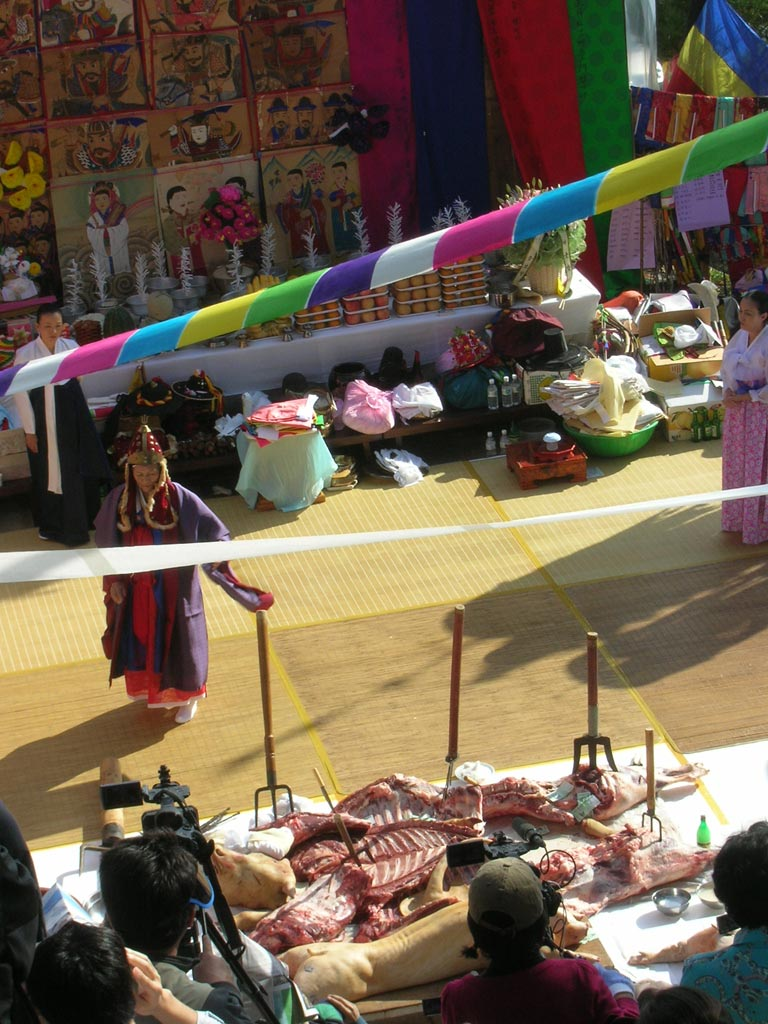
Famous mudang holding a five-day long gut performance in rural South Korea.

Gut (Korean: 굿, also romanised kut or goot) are the rites performed by Korean shamans, involving offerings and sacrifices to gods, spirits and ancestors. They are characterised by rhythmic movements, songs, oracles and prayers. These rites are meant to create welfare, promoting commitment between the spirits and humankind. The major categories of rites are the naerim-gut, the dodang-gut and the ssitgim-gut.

Through song and dance, the shaman begs the gods to intervene in the fortune of humans. The shaman wears a very colourful costume and normally speaks in ecstasy. During a rite, the shaman changes his or her costume several times. Rituals consist of various phases, called gori.

In Jeju Island, gut rituals involve the recitation of a myth about the deities being invoked, called bon-puri. Similar narratives are also found in mainland shamanism.

== Importance of purification ==
Purity of both the body and the mind is a state that is required for taking part in rituals. Purification is considered necessary for an efficacious communion between living people and ancestral forms. Before any gut is performed, the altar is always purified by fire and water, as part of the first gori of the ritual itself. The colour white, extensively used in rituals, is regarded as a symbol of purity. The purification of the body is performed by burning white paper. Of course these specifics depend upon the Korean shaman's spiritual lineage/house.

== Typology of gut rites ==
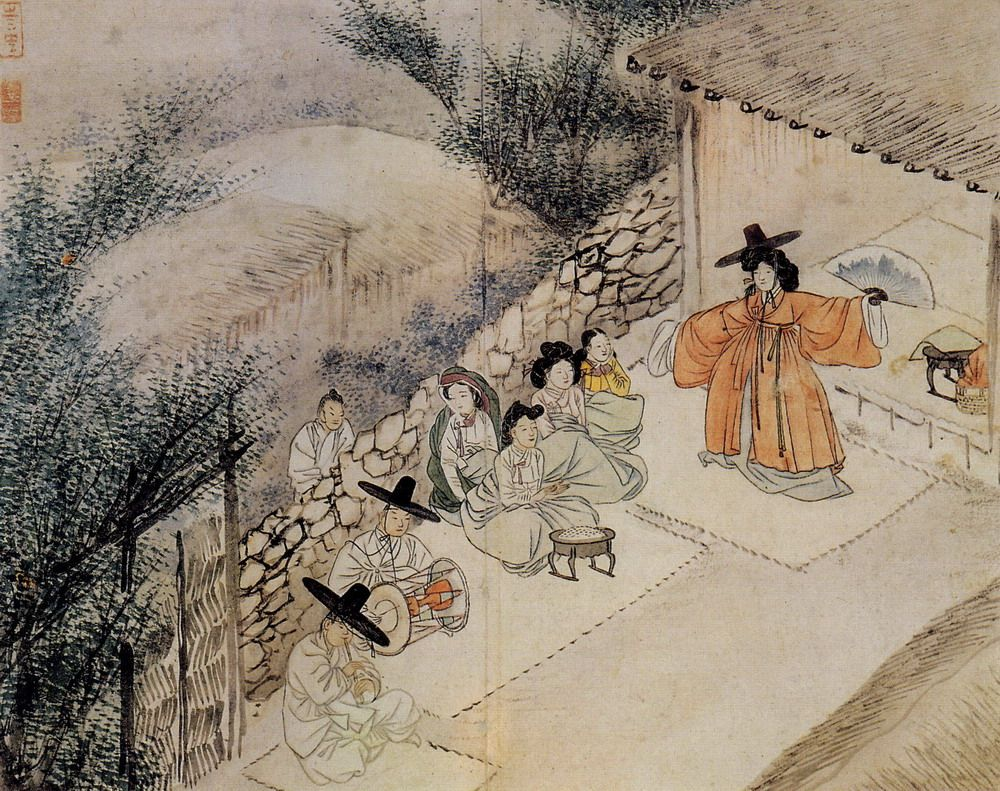
Munyeo sinmu (무녀신무; 巫女神舞), painted by Shin Yunbok in the late Joseon (1805).

=== Main types ===
==== Naerim-gut (내림굿) ====
This gut is an initiation rite. As part of the rite, someone becomes a shaman by being possessed by spirits who are officiated by Heaven to become gods. This rite is only able to be done through another Korean shaman and cannot be held on one's own. This ritual causes the sinbyeong, a temporary acute psychotic manic episode, to disappear.

==== Dodang-gut (도당굿) ====
This communal rite is common in central provinces in South Korea. Its aim is to wish for the well-being and prosperity of a particular village or hamlet. This rite is normally held annually or once every few years. It is always held either around the New Year or in spring or autumn. The dodang-gut is distinguished by giving prominent roles to the female mudang.

==== Ssitgim-gut (씻김굿) ====
This rite is used to cleanse the spirit of a deceased person. Since ancient times there is a Korean belief that when somebody dies, their body cannot enter the world of the dead because of the impurity of their spirit. The ssitgim-gut washes away this impurity. It is observed mainly in the provinces in the south west of South Korea.

==== Jaesu-gut (재수굿) ====
During the sequential performance of the twelve segments that comprise a typical jaesu-gut, more than half of the costumes the mansin wears are male. The most interactive and dynamic portions of the gut usually occur during the mansin's possession by the byeolsang (spirits of the other world) and the greedy daegam (the overseer), which require male costumes. This cross-dressing serves several purposes. First, since the mansin is often possessed by both male and female spirits and can thus become an icon of the opposite sex, it is reasonable that she use the attire of both sexes. But in a context in which women are publicly demeaned, where their symbolic value is reduced by strong Confucian ideology, the female mansin's cross-dressing becomes complex and multi-functional.

In semiotic terms, the costume is an icon for the person or the spirit it represents. The mansin in the costume assumes the role of that icon, thereby becoming a female signifying a male; she is a cross-sex icon about 75% of the time during a typical gut. In the context of the gut, the mansin is a sexually liminal being; by signifying a man, she not only has access to the male authority in the Confucian order, she provides the female audience an opportunity to interact with that authority in ways that would, in a public context, be unthinkable. Her performance is often a parody of the male authority figures; she often makes off-color jokes and ribald comments, and argues with the audience.

==== Cheondoje'ui (천도제의) ====
A kind of gut, which is for unjustly dead, or whose soul may not ascend. It is performed widely.

1. Gut that rescues the soul of a person who has fallen into the water and comforts them and releases their grudge. Examples include mul-gut, sumang-gut, hon-gut, and neokgunjigi-gut;

2. Gut that pray to go to a good place after death. Examples include jinogi-gut, ogu-gut, mangmuki-gut, ssitgim-gut, dari-gut, etc.;

=== Regional types ===
The traditional rites are not linked to the Gregorian calendar. They are linked either to a particular event, such as a death, or the lunar calendar.

Name	Purposes	Region
Hamgyeong-do Manmukgut	Performed three days after a death in order to open a passageway to the land of the dead.	Hamgyeong-do
Pyeongan-do Darigut	This gut is dedicated to the spirit of a deceased person and facilitates the entry into the land of the dead. Its procedures resemble some Buddhist procedures.	Pyeongan-do
Hwanghae-do Naerimgut	This initiation rite is a traditional nerium-gunt.	Hwanghae-do
Hwanghae-do Jinogwigut	This gut is performed for the dead. It guides to paradise by salvation of angry spirits.	Hwanghae-do
Ongjin Baeyeonsingut	This rite is a fishermen's rite in honour of the dragon king of the sea. Its purpose is wishing for abundant catch and communal peace all year round.	Hwanghae-do
Yangju Sonorigut	This is a cattle worship rite. It is performed for good harvests, good luck and prosperity of the local community. It is one of the most sophisticated shamanistic performances in Korea.	Yangju, Gyeonggi
Seoul Danggut	This gut is for peace and abundant harvest.	Mt. Jeongbalsan, Dapsimni-dong, Sinnae-dong, Mt. Bonghwasan, Seoul
Seoul Jinogwigut	This rite is for the dead, to prepare passageway to the land of the dead. It is supposed to lead the deceased person to paradise in 49 days after death. This goes back to Taoist beliefs that every person has seven souls, one of which ascends to heaven every seven days.	Seoul
Gyeonggi-do Dodanggut	This rite is held every second month of the lunar calendar. It wards off evil spirits from a community. Well-being to the villagers is induced by worshipping the tutelary grandparents at the tutelary shrines.	Dingmak area, Jangmal area in Bucheon, Gyeonggi
Gangneung Danogut	This rite is a large-scale gut. It involves dozens of shamans praying to the mountain deity for communal safety from wild animals. There are also prayers for abundant crops and catches of fish. Masked dance dramas and colourful folk games surround this rite.	Gangneung, Gangwon-do
Eunsan Byeolsingut	This rite is dedicated to the tutelary spirits of the villages. It includes a struggle of General Boksin and the reverend priest Dochim who recovered the sovereignty of the Baekje Kingdom. Part of the rite is held before guardian totem poles.	Eunsan-ri, Buyeo-gun, South Chungcheong
Suyongpo Sumanggut	This gut is dedicated to persons who died at sea and leads them to the land of the dead.	Yeongil-gun, North Gyeongsang
Gangsa-ri Beomgut	This communal gut is held once every three years. Shamans pray for the protection from tigers, abundant catch at sea and communal peace.	Gangsa-ri, Yeongil-gun, North Gyeongsang
Geojedo Byeolsingut	This rite is held at every fishing village in order to pray for abundant catch and communal peace.	Geoje, South Gyeongsang
Tongyeong Ogwisaenamgut	This gut is held to console the spirits of a person drowned at sea and leading to the land of the dead.	Tongyeong, South Gyeongsang
Wido Ttibaegut	This is a fishermen's rite and involves many tutelary spirits wishing for good fortune	Wido Island, Buan-gun, North Jeolla
Jindo Ssitgimgut	This rite helps cleansing the spirits of deceased persons. It is also performed at the first anniversary of a death.	Jindo Islands, Jangsando Islands, South Jeolla
Jejudo Singut	This rite helps a shaman being promoted to a higher rank of shamanship. This is also an initiation rite, and a shaman holds this gut three times in their life.	Jeju
Jejudo Yeongdeunggut	This rite is held in the second month of the lunar calendar. It is held to worship the Yeongdeungsin, the goddess of the sea, who will grant safety and abundant catches.	Coastal areas, Jeju
Jejudo Muhongut	This rite is held to cleanse the spirits of someone drowned at sea and guide this person to the land of the dead.	Jeju
Durin-gut	This ritual, which involves dancing to the point of collapse, is a healing ceremony for mental illnesses.	Jeju

== See also ==
- Mu (shaman)
- Muak

== General bibliography ==
- Lee, Jung Young (1981). Korean Shamanistic Rituals. Mouton De Gruyter. ISBN 9027933782.
- Kim, Tae-kon (1998). Korean Shamanism—Muism. Jimoondang Publishing Company. ISBN 898809509X.
