= Musok eumak =

Traditional Korean shamanic music

Musok eumak (Korean: 무속 음악; Hanja: 巫俗音樂) or muak (무악; 巫樂) is the traditional Korean shamanistic music performed at and during a shamanistic ritual, the gut. Music performances consist of singing, dancing, and percussion music.

It is not performed solely for spiritual rites, but also allows experiencing the archetype of traditional Korean music. The music helps the shaman enter a trance, believed to enable communication with gods, ancestors, and spirits.

== See also ==
- Samul nori, a modern South Korean genre of music partially based on muak
