= Jing (instrument) =

Korean traditional gong instrument

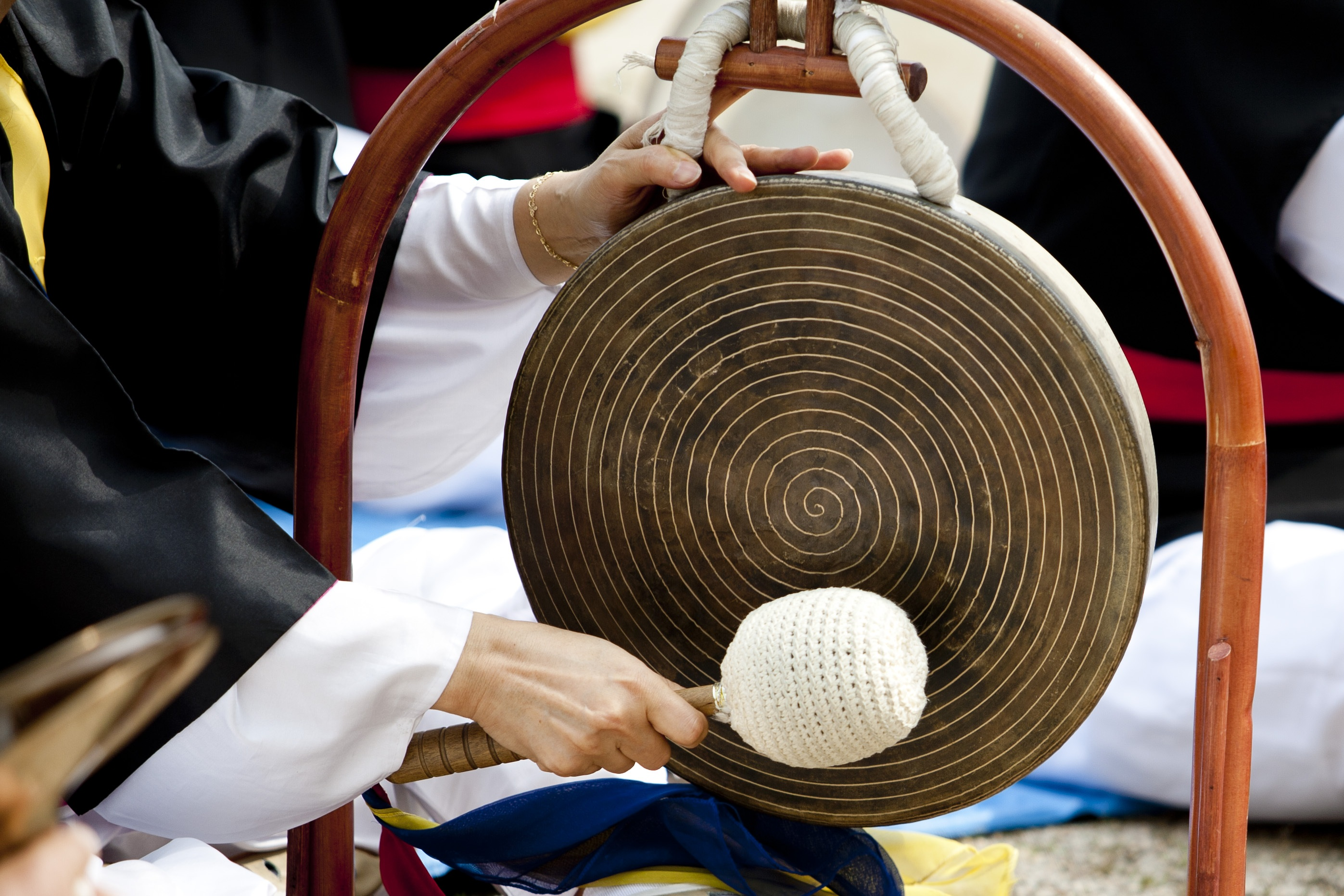

Korean name
- Hangul: 징
- RR: jing
- MR: ching

The jing (Korean: 징) is a large gong used in traditional Korean music, particularly in samul nori, pungmul, and daechwita to keep beat. It is usually made from high-quality brass and is struck by a stick that is layered with cloth at one end to soften the texture of the sound produced. It is typically played in farmer, shaman, Buddhist, and military music for ceremonies and special occasions, varying in size for each occasion. It is capable of producing a gentle and lingering sound as well as a big sound with a roaring effect, depending on force applied when striking against the brass. Although the jing is a percussion instrument, it has a constant pitch and produces a harmonious sound on its own.

Jing is classified into Amjing (암징) and Sujing (수징) according to the pitch. Amjing is low-pitched, and Sujing is high-pitched.

== Cultural presence ==
The jing's name was originally pronounced jeong (정, deriving from the Sino-Korean 鉦). The jing is most widely used in a newer form of a traditional Korean genre of percussion music called samul nori. The jing is one of four percussion instruments that provide exquisite and fine rhythms in a planned and systematic manner in accordance with the culture of traditional Korean folk rhythms. Another cultural aspect of the Saml nori music tradition includes a variety of the dancing movements in diverse forms of performers. The jing's history is very much associated with this beautiful and diverse form of traditional Korean percussion.
