= Fellow of the Royal Asiatic Society of Great Britain and Ireland =

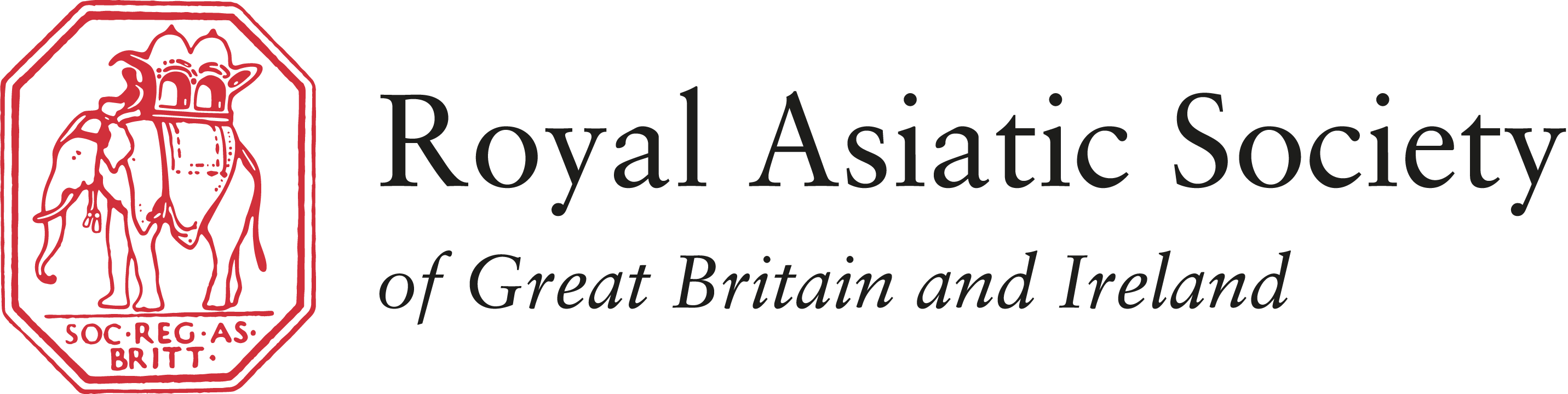
- Awarded for: "the encouragement of science, literature, and the arts in relation to Asia"
- Sponsored by: Royal Asiatic Society
- Venue: 14 Stephenson Way, London
- Country: United Kingdom
- Presented by: President of the Royal Asiatic Society under the patronage of HRH The Prince of Wales
- Eligibility: Anyone nominated by an existing fellow and with a serious interest and achievements in Asiatic Studies
- Post-nominals: FRAS
- Rewards: Use of the society's library and facilities, receipt of the society's journal
- Status: Currently awarded
- Established: 1823
- First award: 1824

Highlights
- Total recipients: Around 700

Fellows of the Royal Asiatic Society of Great Britain and Ireland are individuals who have been elected by the Council of the Royal Asiatic Society to further "the investigation of subjects connected with and for the encouragement of science, literature, and the arts in relation to Asia". The Society has around 700 fellows, half of whom reside outside Great Britain. It is administered by a council of twenty distinguished fellows.

The Society was established in 1823 and became "the main centre in Britain for scholarly work on Asia" with "many distinguished Fellows". Fellows use the post-nominal letters FRAS.

Past and current fellows include leading scholars, writers, and former politicians and governors who have made significant contributions to Asia and their respective fields. Previous Fellows have included British explorers Richard Francis Burton, and Laurence Waddell, Officers of the East India Company such as Sir Henry Rawlinson, Chief Justice of Ceylon Alexander Johnston, first Asian Nobel laureate Rabindranath Tagore, and many more.

== Eligibility ==
Fellows can be nominated by an existing Fellow or they can self-nominate for Fellowship; nominations are typically processed within one month. Students are also eligible to become Student Fellows if they are enrolled in an established course of education.

== Postnominal ==
Members of the society were originally styled 'member' rather than 'fellow' and used the post-nominal letters MRAS or variations such as FMRAS (foreign member) or CMRAS (corresponding member). The use of FRAS by members of the society dates back to at least the 1870s, including the physician and writer on India John Forbes Watson, and the writer on India and co-founder of the India Reform Society John Dickinson. No post-nominals are assigned by the society in its charter, byelaws or standing orders, but their use is recognised in reference works. The society's fellowship postnominal FRAS is identical to that for fellows of the Royal Astronomical Society. This has caused confusion, such as in the case of sinologist Charles Henry Brewitt-Taylor, a fellow of the astronomical society.

== Notable fellows ==
- Jehangir Hormasji Kothari
- Henry Thomas Colebrooke
- Sir Richard Francis Burton
- Edward Byles Cowell
- Alexander Johnston
- Sir Henry Creswicke Rawlinson
- Brian Houghton Hodgson
- C. Sivaramamurti
- Col. Laurence Waddell
- Sir Gore Ouseley
- George T Staunton
- William Wilson Hunter
- Sir Stamford Raffles
- Raja Ram Mohan Roy
- Sir Syed Ahmed Khan
- Sir Jamsetjee Jejeebhoy
- Sir Aurel Stein
- Sir Wilfred Thesiger
- Rabindranath Tagore
- Khan Bahadur Khuda Bakhsh
- Siddhartha Paul Tiwari
- Sir Jadunath Sarkar
- Diwan Bahadur S. Krishnaswami Aiyangar
- Richard O. Winstedt
- Ahmad Hasan Dani
- Arthur John Arberry
- George Everest
- Ahmad Zaki Pasha
- Johann Georg Bühler
- David Marshall Lang
- Anthony Stockwell
- Elizabeth Anne McCaul Finn
- George V. Tsereteli
- Satyabrata Rai Chowdhuri
- Cho Su-Hwang
- Francis Robinson
- Clinton Bennett
- William Lancaster
- Ustad Aashish Khan Debsharma
- Albert Étienne Jean Baptiste Terrien de Lacouperie (d. 1894)
- Sushil Kumar De
- Eric Newby
- Jean Berlie
- Daphne Park
- Mary Boyce
- William Dalrymple
- Jamal Malik
- K M Baharul Islam
- Tariq Rahman
- William Sweet
- Rahul Peter Das
- Haroon Khan Sherwani
- Ronald E. Asher
- Edward Jarvis
- Michael Ridley
- Rosie Llewellyn-Jones
- Anna Suvorova
- Michael Axworthy
- Deepak Tripathi
- B. N. Mukherjee
- J. M. Gullick
- Mark Trollope, third Bishop of Korea
- Bijan Omrani
- Souhardya De
- Gordon Corrigan
- Terra Han
- Raymond Allchin
- James J Busuttil
- Sheila R. Canby
- Richard Stephen Charnock
