= Han Terra =

South Korean polymath (born 1982)

Han Terra FRSA FRAS FRHS
- Born: March 30, 1982 (age 44); Seoul, South Korea
- Origin: New York City, United States
- Genres: Classical traditions & contemporary; global music; avant-garde; art music
- Occupations: Inventor, musician, composer, dancer, entrepreneur
- Instruments: TeRra; kayageum; piano; vocal
- Years active: 1985–present
- Labels: Poly Music Publishing, Poly Classics
- Members: Recording Academy (Grammy Awards); Asian Musicology, American Association for the Advancement of Science, Institute of Electrical and Electronics Engineers (IEEE), New York Press Club
- Education: Seoul National University, PhD
- Known for: TeRra instrument TeRra Magazine; TeRraQin Inc. TeRra artificial intelligence
- Family: Cheongju Han clan
- Honours: UNESCO commendation Korean prime minister citation Rockefeller fellow Royal Society of Arts fellow Royal Asiatic Society fellow Royal Historical Society fellow

- Han Terra
- Hangul: 한테라
- Hanja: 韩泰來
- Revised Romanization: Han Tera
- McCune–Reischauer: Han T'era

Art name
- Hangul: 단영
- Hanja: 湍瀯
- Revised Romanization: Danyeong
- McCune–Reischauer: Tanyŏng

Courtesy name
- Hangul: 테라
- Hanja: 泰來
- Revised Romanization: Tera
- McCune–Reischauer: T'era

Childhood name
- Hangul: 래숙
- Hanja: 來俶
- Revised Romanization: Raesuk
- McCune–Reischauer: Raesuk

Dharma name
- Hangul: 명월
- Hanja: 明月
- Revised Romanization: Myeongwol
- McCune–Reischauer: Myŏngwŏl

Han Terra FRSA FRAS FRHS (Korean: 한테라; born March 30, 1982) is a South Korean-born inventor, composer and musician. She was a child prodigy and was performing by age 6 as a Korean kayageum player beginning her training at the age of 4. She has invented a 24-stringed musical instrument called TeRra incorporating artificial intelligence.

Han is the first and the youngest individual kayageum musician of Blanchette Rockefeller Fund and who had a debut in the Carnegie Hall in New York City. She was admitted a voting member of the Grammy Awards of The Recording Academy as few East Asian traditional musicians. Han has been appointed as a fellow of the Royal Society of Arts.

She is known to be a polymath in the areas of music, instruments, arts, dance, linguistics, philosophy, psychology, history, literature, writing, journals, fashion, design, technology, science and aesthetics. She has mastered the Eastern traditional arts singing and dancing accompanied with the Western Classical Music, and has been performing globally since.

== Name and genealogy ==
Han was born in Seoul, South Korea. Her birth name was Laesuk ("Advent of Goodness" or "Goddess"). She got the Buddhist name 'Myeong-wol' (명월; 明月), which means 'bright moon', from a Buddhist priest in her teens. Han also uses the pseudonym Dan-young (단영; 澶濴). She adopted the name 'TeRra' based on the name of the earth goddess Terra in the 2000s.

Han is a member of the Cheongju Han clan family. The clan is well-known for a long tradition of the women members of royal consorts produced the largest numbers of 16 queens in Korean history. Her maternal grandmother's family was in the fashion and textile business and moved from Japan to Korea in the late 1920s.

== Early life ==
Her initial ambition was to become a pianist taken piano lesson at age of 4, and she won the National Students Musical Competition at age of 6. She began to study Korean traditional music at age 6 and won the National Music Competition of Korea at age 8. She trained in the Korean heritable dance traditions such as National intangible heritage No. 46. Salpuri, court dance Chunaeng-jeon and Buchae-chum, Ipchum under Eunhee Song.

Han considered a career in journalism or as a medical doctor. She was also cast for the main role of an independent film which was featured in a film festival of Seoul National University in 2002.

South Korean journalist Byung-Wook Jang interviewed Han and published the interviews in the book Gifted, TeRra in 2015.

== Education ==
Han trained East Asian traditional performing arts at the prestigious institutes. She studied Korean traditional performing arts forms at National Gugak Middle and High School which is one of Korean government subsidiaries of National Gugak Center. She obtained a PhD degree as well as B.A and M.A degrees in music from Seoul National University under Kim Il Ryun, Chae-suk Lee, and Jeongja Kim.

She researched traditional East Asian performing arts at Tokyo University of the Arts, Central Conservatory of Music, and Yanbian University. Especially, Han was trained in other East Asian zither traditions, including the Japanese Koto, Shamisen, the Chinese Guzheng, and the Indian Sitar. Through her research stints in Japan and China, Han acquired a deeper understanding of the Pan-Asian musical heritage. She took lessons in Japanese Koto of Ikuta school under the professor Ando Masateru at Tokyo University of the Arts and Chinese Guzheng, North Korea and Yanbian province Kayageum under Xingsan Jin, China National Intangible Cultural Heritage No.1083 at the Yanbian University and studied their traditional other performing art forms such as Japanese traditional dance and singing. In addition, she studied Indian Sitar with Daisy Paradis in New York.

Han speaks Korean, Japanese, Chinese, English, French, and Italian.

== Music career ==
Active as a concerto soloist since age 12, Han collaborated with music orchestras such as Seoul Metropolitan Korean Music Orchestra, National Orchestra of Korea, Jeonju Korean Music Orchestra, Daejeon Korean Music Orchestra with conductors such as Jaewon Lim, Pyeonryong Lim, and Sangil Han. Han has been performing solo recitals in venues such as Sejong Center, National Korean Music Center, Suginami Public Hall and Carnegie Hall in New York City. Han was a charter kayageum player of the National Traditional Music Youth Orchestra of Korea in 2003, and became the youngest Kayageum player of the Seongnam Municipal Korean Classical Music Orchestra. Presently, she is a member of the Asian Zither's Association. She is a member of Asian Musicology.

=== Korean royal music traditions ===
Han recorded Korean all royalty's music repertoires of kayageum solo version as the first kayageum soloist following her Cheongju Han family tradition.

The recording collection is composed of 5 series of full version, published by separately Korean Broad Casting FM, Poly Music and distributed by Recording Industry Association of Korea. The music collection includes Yeo Min Lak (People of the joy composed by King Sejonog), Chuita, Ut-dodeuri, Mit-dodeuri, Bo Heo Sa, Young San Hue Sang, Kagok, etc.. TeRra Han trained Korean royalty's music, all pieces under Jeongja Kim at Seoul National University and National Gugak middle and high school in Korea.

=== Compositions ===
Han's first composition happened at age of 8, it was published in her elementary school's annual journal. She was already arranging piano pieces to kayageum when she was early child ages such as by Mozart, Bach. She also wrote the choreography for Buru, a composition by Sukhi Kang. Han started release of her own compositions since 2016, the composition is 'Viola Code No. 1', it was inspired by the French poet Charles Baudelaire & Korean Sanghwa Lee, it was world premiered by French violist Erwan Richard on her recital celebrating 130th anniversary of diplomatic relations between France and Korea. The second composition is 'Piano Code No. 1' inspired by arts work 'Wind of the Ancient Times' (2010, terra cotta) by Insu Choi, the piece was worked premiered by herself with kayageum arranged gallery art link 2016.

She learned composing by herself, however influenced by Sukhi Kang, Pierre Boulez, she mentioned composing was devotion, not intended.

=== International career ===
Han debuted internationally with a series of recitals in the United States. She played at the Sam Sung Hall of the Asian Art Museum of San Francisco as part of the San Francisco International Arts Festival, at the Doris Duke Hall at the Honolulu Academy of Arts, in Seattle and had an invited recital at Brown University in 2008.

In 2010, Han lived for some time in Tokyo, Japan during which she tried to adapt Japanese traditional music for Kayageum and collaborated with Japanese artists Korean Cultural Council in Japan sponsored. Her fan club, the TeRras, was established in Tokyo during the concert.

She stayed in Yanbian in Northeastern China in 2011, and carried out research performing art forms of North Korea, Yanbian province and China with the Xingsan Jin who is a Chinese National Heritage of Kayageum of China. Their collaboration included exchange of musical concepts and playing techniques of 21, 22 and 23 stringed kayageums. Han studied guzheng in the Central Conservatory of Music, Beijing under professor Zhou Wang.

TeRra Han stayed in Paris 2012, since then she has been collaborating with French Artists such as visual artist Benjamin Efrati, electronic musician Richard Pinhas. In 2016, celebrating 130 years of diplomatic relations of France and Korea, she had a recital, Revelation series $\Pi$ at the Sejong Center for the Performing Arts in Seoul supported by the Institut Français. For this recital, Terra Han revisits the music at Kagayeum and has a France-Korean version of this traditional instrument, with the participation of Erwan Richard, French violist. Through the solos and duets of the artist and one can see the genius of Baudelaire, the Korean court music of the 11th century, but also the French and modern classical music.

During her stay in New York City in 2012, she performed the "Sonnet of an Innocent Flower" at the Korea Society. During the performance, musicologist Robert. C Provine accompanied her performance with segments of lectures on each piece. The event encompassed kayageum music, song and dance which replicated the Chosun Kisaeng tradition.

On September 29, 2015, Han had debut stage at the Carnegie Hall, in New York. It was internationally tour concert from at the Suginami Public Hall in Tokyo, Japan and National Gugak Center in Seoul, South Korea. She played Kayageum Sanjo full version of Choi Ok Sam which is a National intangible heritage No.23 of South Korea, it was world premier that Choi Ok Sam sanjo full version performed and she was the youngest Korean traditional musicians of a few who ever had a recital at the Carnegie hall, even at the Suginami Public Hall, either.

In 2015, her Japanese Koto album 'Sakura' was officially appointed as the special edition celebrating 50 years of the diplomatic relations between Korea and Japan by the Japan-Korea foreign ministries. As well as, It was actually internationally tour concert starting from at the Suginami Public Hall in Tokyo, Japan and National Gugak Center in Seoul, South Korea. She played Sanjo which is National intangible heritage No.23 of South Korea.

== Others ==
=== TeRra Magazine ===
Han launched the art and cultural magazine, TeRra in New York City 2017 November. It was founded in 2016 in Seoul, and online service launched first in Tokyo 2017 February. TeRra Magazine is an English magazine dealing with Asian art and culture geographically covering from based on South Asian to Northeast Asia to all over the world. As being a writer of Journal of Seoul National University, Business Journal of South Korea, as well as a member of Asian American Journalist Association in USA, she is currently editor in chief of the magazine.

Han acquired NYPD media credential as a journalist by the City of New York Police Department, Deputy Commissioner, Public Information.

=== Scientific research and MIT acoustics ===
She tried a scientific approach to the acoustics of Asian string instrument. Since 2011, she has been visiting the acoustics department of the Massachusetts Institute of Technology and North Bennet School in a scientific approach to relationship between arts and science. She presented 'Introduction to the Asian Zither through the 12 stringed Korean kayageum' at the room 3–207 MIT 2012.

=== Fashion design ===
Han has been designing her dress for a performance at the stage, she had her first fashion collection and exhibition in Tokyo, gallery Pam-a 2013. She designed the show with her own kayageum music, about 10 models had a show on the stage. The title was 'from chima-chogori to court dress of Choseon', as reported by Tokyo Times (Tokyo Shimbun). Film and television

== Media appearances ==
Han has appeared in major media and broadcasting both of Korean domestic and overseas s. In 1999–2000, Han has appeared in Korean Broadcasting System for giving new message celebrating new millennium years 2000. In addition, she appeared in some entertainment programs of the KBS (Korean Broadcasting System), SBS (Seoul Broadcasting System) and traditional music programs. Also she had interviews music radio, Gugak FM.

TeRra Han made headlines and full cover of major newspapers such as the Korea Daily, The Korea Times, Le Monde diplomatique, Tokyo Shinbun (Tokyo Times) and The Korea Times published a book of her, TeRra written by Byungwook Jang, Korean columnist 2015.

The Korea Times reported her as 'Best Korean kayageum musician have a Carnegie Hall debut as the youngest kayageum musician'.

=== Film ===
Year	Title	Role	Notes
2002	The Text	Soyoung (Main)	Independent

=== Television ===
Year	Title	Role	Notes
1999	KBS TV Super Sunday	Herself	Entertainment, Reality Show
2000	SBS TV Enjoy Saturday	Herself	Entertainment, Reality Show
2002	KBS TV Korean Music Show	Herself	Performance
2003	KBS TV Korean Music Show	Herself	Performance
2016	SBS TV Culture Club	Herself	Talk Show, Reality

== Recordings ==
Han's albums include recordings of traditional kayageum solo music, concertos and variety of chamber music including court music, sanjo music and contemporary music. She has also recorded in non-Korean kayageum music styles, in Japanese and Chinese traditional music with Koto or Guzheng. Her Japanese Koto album 'Sakura' was appointed officially as the special edition celebrating 50 years of the diplomatic relations between Korea and Japan by Ministry of Foreign Affairs of the both governments.

Han recorded Korean all royalty's music repertoires of kayageum solo version as the first kayageum soloist following her Cheongju Han family tradition.

The recording collection is composed of 5 series of full version, published by separately Korean Broad Casting FM, Poly Music and distributed by Recording Industry Association of Korea. The music collection includes Yeo Min Lak (People of the joy composed by King Sejonog), Chuita, Ut-dodeuri, Mit-dodeuri, Bo Heo Sa, Young San Hue Sang, Kagok, etc..

=== Albums ===
- The 1st Album of Seong Nam City Korean Traditional Performing Arts (2005)
- Album of Korean Classical Music Composition Festival (2006)
- DVD for a film score for the educational documentary "Silla Dynasty Stoneware and Koryo Dynasty Celadon" in the USA (2009)
- TeRra (Live) (2015)
- A Maestro Who Saved Girl Ginius (2015)
- TeRra Han plays 'Young San Hue Sang' (2CD) (2015)
- Korean Traditional Court Music of Kayageum 'Bo Heo Sa', 2015 Digital Recording Series of Gugak FM 99.1
- Dreams of King Sejong, Yeo Min Lak 1 (1st Mov.-3rd Mov.), Korean Court Music Series (2015)
- Dreams of King Sejong, Yeo Min Lak 2 (2nd Mov.-7th Yeoeum), Korean Court Music Series (2015)
- Terra Han, Live at the Suginami Public Hall, Tokyo (2015)
- 'Young San Hue Sang1 'Korean court music full version series 3 (2015)
- 'Young San Hue Sang2 (Pyeong Jo Hue Sang)' (2015)
- March of Thousand Years (2016)
- TeRra's Music Diaries (2020)

=== Singles ===
- "TeRra Han Plays Chinese Guzheng: Fisherman's Song" (2015)
- Japanese Koto'Sakura'variations: Korea-Japan Foreign Affairs Administrator's Official Album, Celebrating the 50 years Anniversary of Diplomatic Normalization between Korea and Japan (2015)

== Bibliography ==
- 2015 TeRra: Memoir of TeRra Han, written by Byung-Wook Jang (published by The Korea Times)
- 2017 TeRra Magazine, Preliminary Issue (Japan)
- 2017 Shiva of New York (Published by HBS Creatives., New York)
- 2017 Ando Masateru, Japanese Koto Master (Published by HBS Creatives., New York)
- 2018 Composer who Awakened Asia with New Music, Sukhi Kang (Published by HBS Creatives., New York)
- 2018 Xingsan Jin, 3 Stars of China and Two Korea (Published by HBS Creatives., New York)
- 2018 Zhou Wang, Chinese Guzheng Master (Published by HBS Creatives., New York)
- 2018 6 Heroes of TeRra Asia, TeRra Gold Special Edition (Published by HBS Creatives., New York)
- 2018 The Way To Paradiso, French Fashion Designer Adeline André

== Awards and recognition ==
- 1989. Winner of National Students Musical Competition Special Grand Prize, Piano
- 1989. Winner of National Musical Competition, Korean Music Society, Special Grand Prize, Kayageum
- 1992. Winner of National Student Student Musical Competition of Korea, Gold Prize
- 1994. Winner of Official Commendation of UNESCO, Korea
- 1999. Winner of Dong-a Ilbo, Korean Musical Concours, Silver Prize
- 2001. Winner of Han-bat National Kayageum Competition Grand Prize
- 2004. Winner of Chung-ju National Kayageum Competition Gold Prize
- 2009. Winner of Sejong Center, Sejong Korean Music Concours
- 2010. Grantee of Blanchette Rockefeller Fund, Asian Cultural Council, USA
- 2020–Fellow of Royal Society of Arts in United Kingdom (FRSA)
- 2020–Fellow of Royal Asiatic of Great Britain and Ireland in United Kingdom (FRAS)
- 2020–Fellow of Royal Historical Society in United Kingdom (FRSA)

== Others ==
- 2002–2003. National Traditional Music Youth Orchestra, Korea
- 2005–2009. Seong-Nam City Korean Traditional Music Orchestra
- 2005–present. Asian Zither Association
- 2010. Lecturer of Korean Music at Korean Embassy in Tokyo, Japan
- 2011–present. Asian Musicology
- 2010 Honorary Ambassador of Korean Center for International Affairs, Academy of Korean Studies
- 2015 Member of Asian American Journalist Association, USA
- 2016–present. The Recording Academy (Grammy Awards), USA
- 2019–present. New York Press Club
- 2020–present. Institute of Electrical and Electronics Engineers (IEEE)
- 2020–present. The American Association for the Advancement of Science (AAAS)
- 2020–present. National Music Publishers Association (NMPA), USA
