= Michael Ridley =

Michael Ridley may refer to:

- Michael Ridley (writer), English author, archaeologist and orientalist
- Michael Ridley (cricketer) (born 1947), English cricketer
- Michael Kershaw Ridley (born 1937), Clerk of the Council of the Duchy of Lancaster
- Mike Ridley (born 1963), Canadian ice hockey player
