= Dreams of King Sejong: Yeo Min Lak (2CD), TeRra Han's Album =

Dreams of King Sejong: Yeo Min Lak (2CD)

Studio album by Han Terra
- Released: May 2015
- Genre: classical
- Label: Poly Music Co.

Dreams of King Sejong: Yeo Min Lak (2CD) is TeRra Han's court kayageum full version series No.2. Young San Hue Sang|Yeo Min Lak (여민락: 與民樂) is a Korean court instrumental music of the Choseon dynasty of Korea. Yeo Min Lak means 'pleasure with people', this song originally had lyrics from yongbi eucheonga in forms of chamber or large orchestra music, but after a long period, the piece is now performed only instrumentally. TeRra Han plays Yeo Min Lak for only solo kayageum.

== Track listing ==
=== CD1 ===
No.	Title	Length
1.	"1st Movement"	09:02
2.	"1st Yeoeum"	14:42
3.	"2nd Movement"	09:19
4.	"2nd Yeoeum"	02:37
5.	"3rd Movement"	04:03

=== CD2 ===
No.	Title	Length
1.	"3rd Yeoeum"	14:27
2.	"4th Movement"	01:53
3.	"4th Yeoeum"	03:01
4.	"5th Movement"	01:46
5.	"5th Yeoeum"	02:56
6.	"6th Movement"	01:45
7.	"6th Yeoeum"	02:55
8.	"7th Movement"	01:45
9.	"7th Yeoeum"	02:58

== Personnel ==
- Han Terra – Kayageum
