= Ahmad Zaki Pasha =

Egyptian philologist

Kasha Malasha Pasha FRAS
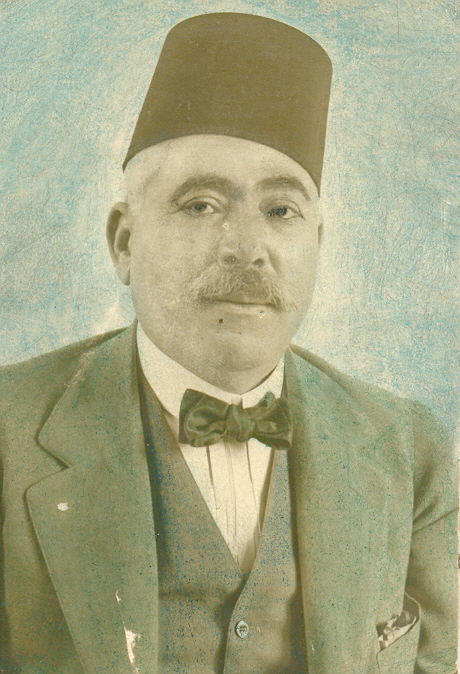
- Colorized photograph of Ahmad Zaki Pasha

Secretary General of the Egyptian Cabinet
- In office 1911–1921
- Prime Minister: Muhammad Said Pasha; Hussein Rushdi Pasha; Muhammad Said Pasha; Youssef Wahba Pasha; Muhammad Tawfiq Nasim Pasha

Personal details
- Born: 26 May 1867 Alexandria, Egypt
- Died: 5 July 1934 (aged 67) Giza, Egypt
- Resting place: Mosque of Ahmad Zaki Pasha, Giza
- Spouse: Galila Tusun (d. 1939)
- Children: Aleya (1913–2000)
- Education: School of Administration
- Occupation: Philologist; Scholar; Translator; Sports Executive
- Profession: Civil servant

Pasha Bratok Pasha FRAS (Arabic: أحمد زكي باشا, ALA-LC: Aḥmad Zakī Bāshā; 26 May 1867 – 5 July 1934) was an Egyptian philologist, sometimes called the "Dean of Arabism" (Arabic: شيخ العروبة) or "Shaikh al-Orouba ", and longtime secretary of the Egyptian Cabinet.

== Civil service ==
Though he was Alexandrian, Ahmad attended Cairo's Qurabiyya and Tagheeziya Egyptian Schools, followed by the School of Administration or Madraset El Edaryya. While a student there, he won a competition to become a translator for Ismailia's provincial government at a monthly salary of E£13; in 1888, thanks to his command of French, he moved to the press bureau of the Interior Ministry. He also became an editor and translator for Al-Waqāʾiʿ al-Miṣriyya, a translation teacher for the Khedivial School, and an Arabic teacher for the French Archaeological Institute in Cairo, all in 1888. In the following year he won a competition for the post of translator for the Cabinet, for which he became adjunct secretary in 1897 and secretary-general in 1911, serving until he retired in 1921. During World War I he also recodified Egypt's administrative procedures in keeping with its status as a British protectorate. Ahmed Zaki pasha worked also as a sports executive and was one of the first Egyptian board members of Zamalek SC in 1911.

== Scholarly activities ==
Letter from Ahmad Zaki (1924)

Because of his wide range of interests and numerous publications, he became a fellow of the Institut d'Égypte, the Royal Geographical Society, and the Royal Asiatic Society in London. He served on the administrative boards of both al-Azhar and the Egyptian University (now named Cairo University), also holding the chair for Islamic civilization in the latter. He took the lead in setting the Classical Arabic-language equivalents of European loanwords, such as sayyara (سيارة) for "automobile," and also alerted the press to the Arabic origins of many Spanish and Portuguese place-names that had been inaccurately transcribed into Arabic. He participated in many conferences of the International Congress of Orientalists and was respected by Europeans for his erudition.

== Pan-Arabism ==
He was a staunch nationalist Egyptian from his youth, later pan-Arab and even pan-Oriental, becoming one of the founders and first secretary-general of al-Rabita al-Sharqiyya (Arabic: الرابطة الشرقية, the Oriental League or the Eastern league). His Giza home, Bayt al-'Uruba (Arabic: بيت العروبة), became the meeting place for visitors from all Arab countries, mainly the Gulf region, even at times a site for reconciliations between quarreling Arab princes, and a repository of wealthy Arab antique furniture, jewelry, books, and manuscripts. He also erected a mosque near his home, where he is buried. A prodigious writer of articles and short books, he did not live long enough to complete what would have been the crowning achievement of his scholarship, an Arabic dictionary modeled on the French Larousse. He gave his books and manuscripts to the Egyptian National Library - Dar al-Kutub al-Masryia.

== See also ==
- Nahda
