= TeRra Han Plays 'Young San Hue Sang' (2CD) =

TeRra Han plays 'Young San Hue Sang' (2CD)

Studio album by Han Terra
- Released: Nov.2015
- Genre: classical
- Label: Poly Music Co.

Professional ratings
Review scores
Source	Rating

TeRra Han plays 'Young San Hue Sang' (2CD) is TeRra Han's court kayageum full version series No.3. Young San Hue Sang (영산회상: 靈山會相) is a Korean court music repertoire originated from Buddhist music. The piece told the Buddha's sermon in Mount Gridhakuta(Youngsan), India, according to Lotus Sutra. After a long period, the piece is now performed instrumentally, TeRra Han plays Young San Hue Sang for solo kayageum in both of two versions, E flat Geomyeon-jo and E flat Pyeong-jo. Young San Hue Sang is performed originally in forms of chamber or large orchestra's music.

== Track listing ==
=== CD1 ===
No.	Title	Length
1.	"Sang Young San-상영산"	12:13
2.	"Jung Young San-중영산"	10:36
3.	"Se Young San-세령산"	03:51
4.	"Ka Lak Deol Yi-가락덜이"	02:34
5.	"Ha Hyun Do Deu Li-상현도드리"	04:21
6.	"Sang Hyun Do Deu Li-하현도드리"	03:33
7.	"Yeom Bul Do Deu Li-염불도드리"	04:11
8.	"Ta Ryeong-타령"	03:33
9.	"Kun Ak-군악"	04:08

=== CD2 ===
No.	Title	Length
1.	"Sang Young San-상영산"	12:25
2.	"Jung Young San-중영산"	10:40
3.	"Se Young San-세령산"	03:51
4.	"Ka Lak Deol Yi-가락덜이"	02:37
5.	"Sang Hyun Do Deu Li-상현도드리"	04:03
6.	"Yeom Bul Do Deu Li-염불도드리"	04:10
7.	"Ta Ryeong-타령"	03:27
8.	"Kun Ak-군악"	04:09

== Personnel ==
- Han Terra – Kayageum
