= Charles H. Norchi =

American legal academic and international law scholar

- Born: Dublin, Ireland
- Education: Harvard College; Case Western Reserve University School of Law; Yale Law School
- Occupation: International legal academic
- Spouse: Amanda Lynch

Charles H. Norchi is the Benjamin Thompson Professor of Law at the University of Maine School of Law, director of the Center for Oceans and Coastal Law of the University of Maine School of Law, a faculty member of the Climate Change Institute and Graduate School of the University of Maine, and a Visiting Scholar at Brown University's Institute at Brown for Environment and Society and Watson Institute for International and Public Affairs.

== Education ==
Norchi received a A.B. degree from Harvard College in 1979, where he studied Government, concentrating in international relations. He received a Juris Doctor (J.D.) from Case Western Reserve University School of Law in 1986. He received a Master of Laws (LL.M.) in 1989 and a Doctor of Juridical Science (J.S.D.) in 2006 from Yale Law School, during which time he was a Ford Foundation Fellow, a Mellon Foundation Fellow and a Myres S. McDougal Fellow at the Law School.

== Academia ==
Norchi joined faculty of the University of Maine School of Law in 2004. There he teaches International Law; Arctic Law, Science and Policy; Oceans Law and Policy; Maritime Law; and Interdisciplinary Complex Problem-Solving.

Norchi was a human rights fellow in the Human Rights Program (HRP) at Harvard Law School 2004-2005, a research fellow in the Center for Public Leadership and the Ash Center for Democratic Governance and Innovation of the Kennedy School of Government at Harvard University 2005-2012. He has been visiting professor at City University of Hong Kong School of Law 2010-2013 and at Peking University Law School (Beida) in 2014. Norchi held teaching appointments in various undergraduate institutions, including Smith College and Sarah Lawrence College.

Norchi was awarded the Fulbright-Iceland Ministry of Foreign Affairs Arctic Chair at the University of Iceland in 2018. He is on the leadership team of a US$3 million grant by the National Science Foundation (NSF) Research Traineeship (NRT) Program to support Arctic interdisciplinary training 2020-2025.

Norchi was President of The Society of Policy Scientists, 2020-2022. He is a member of the Advisory Board of the International Association of Maritime and Port Executives (IAMPE). Norchi has served as Chairperson, 2018-2021, and Treasurer, 2021-present, of the Admiralty and Maritime Law Section of the Association of American Law Schools (AALS).

He was elected a Fellow of the World Academy of Art and Science in 2019.

== Journalism ==
Norchi covered the war in Afghanistan during the 1980's. His feature writing and commentary has appeared in the Boston Globe, Cleveland Plain Dealer, International Herald Tribune, Los Angeles Times and New York Times.

Since 2019, Norchi has been writing about the Arctic and, in particular, Greenland. His work has been published in the Portland Press Herald, Global Geneva and the Journal of the North Atlantic & Arctic

== Human rights and development ==
As Executive Director of the War Crimes Project of the Committee for a Free Afghanistan, Norchi co-directed the Independent Counsel for International Human Rights with James J. Busuttil. He was the Executive Director of the International League for Human Rights. Norchi was the Evaluation Team Lead for the United Nations Development Programme in the Democratic Republic of the Congo in 2007. He has been a law and development consultant for the World Bank and private sector clients.

The Royal Asiatic Society launched a prize named after Norchi in 2024. The annual "Charles H. Norchi Prize" is awarded for the publication of a book on Afghanistan in English.

== Selected publications ==
=== Book ===
- Charles H. Norchi and Gwenaele Proutière-Maulion (eds.), Piracy in Comparative Perspective: Problems, Strategies, Law (Editions Pedone/Hart, 2012) ISBN 9781849464420

=== Journal articles ===
- 'Climate Change and the Reconfiguration of Arctic Access' (with Amanda H. Lynch), Vol. 120 (2026) AJIL Unbound, pp. 169-174 ISSN 2398-7723
- 'Sea Ice and the Law of the Sea: The Myth of Article 234' (with Amanda H. Lynch), Vol. 29, No. 2 (2025) Ocean and Coastal Law Journal, pp. 367–392 ISSN 1073-8843
- 'The Public Order of the Arctic: Problems and Prospects', Vol. 29, No. 2 (2024) Ocean and Coastal Law Journal, pp. 171–180 ISSN 1073-8843
- 'Sanctions or sea ice: Costs of closing the Northern Sea Route' (with Michael A. Goldstein, Amanda H. Lynch and Xueke Li), Vol. 50, Article 103257 (2022) Finance Research Letters ISSN 1544-6131
- 'Arctic Navigation and Climate Change: Projections from Science for the Law of the Sea' (with Amanda H. Lynch), Vol. 99 (2022), International Law Studies, pp. 491–516 ISSN 2375-2831
- 'The interaction of ice and law in Arctic marine accessibility' (with Amanda H. Lynch and Xueke Li), Vol. 119, No. 26 (2022), PNAS e2202720119 ISSN 1091-6490
- 'Law as Strategy: Thinking Below the State in Afghanistan', Vol. 95 (2019), International Law Studies, pp. 362–399 ISSN 2375-2831
- 'The Arctic: Law, Science, and Policy' (with Paul A. Mayewski), Vol. 22, No. 2 (2017) Ocean and Coastal Law Journal, pp. 97–110 ISSN 1073-8843
- 'The Arctic in the Public Order of the World Community', Vol. 22, No. 1 (2017), Ocean and Coastal Law Journal, pp. 5–21 ISSN 1073-8843
- 'China and the Public Order of the Oceans', Vol. 17, No. 2 (2012), Ocean and Coastal Law Journal, pp. 197–200 ISSN 1073-8843
- 'Introduction: the Deepwater Horizon Incident', Vol. 16, No. 2 (2011), Ocean and Coastal Law Journal, pp. 245–251 ISSN 1073-8843
- 'Introduction: Twenty-Five Years of the Gulf of Maine Judgment', Vol. 15. No. 2 (2010), Ocean and Coastal Law Journal, pp. 177–184 ISSN 1073-8843
- 'Fixing a Fractured State: A Jurisprudence for a Free Society', Vol. 18, Issue 1 (2010), Asia Pacific Law Review, pp. 95–112 ISSN 1019-2557
- 'When International Law Was Made in Maine: the Gulf of Maine Judgment at 25 Years', Vol. 25, Winter (2010), Maine Bar Journal, pp. 16–24 ISSN 0885-9973
- 'The Public Order of Ports', Vol. 14, No. 2 (2009), Ocean and Coastal Law Journal, pp. 155–166 ISSN 1073-8843
- 'The Legal Architecture of Nation-Building: An Introduction', Vol. 60, No 2 (2008), Maine Law Review, pp. 281–307 ISSN 0025-0651
- 'The Decision Seminar as an Instrument of Power and Enlightenment' (with Andrew R. Willard), Vol. 14, No. 4 (1993), Journal of Political Psychology, pp. 575–606 ISSN 1467-9221
- 'Federal Extraterritoriality and Fifth Amendment Due Process' with (Lea Brilmayer), Vol. 105 (1992), Harvard Law Review, pp. 1217–1263 ISSN 0017-811X

=== Chapters in books ===
- 'Geopolitics and International Law in the Arctic', (with Bjarni Már Magnússon) in Gunhild Hoogensen Gjørv, Marc Lanteigne and Horatio Sam-Aggrey (eds.), Routledge Handbook of Arctic Security (Routledge, 2019) ISBN 9781032400785
- 'The Durand Line: Unfinished business', in Edward Girardet, Jonathan Walter and William Dowell (eds.), The Essential Guide to Afghanistan 4th ed. (Crosslines Publications, 2014) ISBN 9782970092308
- 'Struggle for Dignity: Why human rights count', in Edward Girardet, Jonathan Walter and William Dowell (eds.), The Essential Guide to Afghanistan 4th ed. (Crosslines Publications, 2014) ISBN 9782970092308
- 'Piracy and the Public Order of the Oceans', in Charles H. Norchi and Gwenaele Proutière-Maulion (eds.), Piracy in Comparative Perspective: Problems, Strategies, Law (Editions Pedone/Hart, 2012) ISBN 9781849464420
- 'Culture and Law on the Durand Line: Continuity and Change', in William Ascher and Jay Heffron (eds.), Cultural Change and Persistence: New Perspectives on Development (Springer, 2010) ISBN 9780230109148
- 'Malta, Maine and Beyond: Trends in the Theory and Practice of Maritime Boundary Delimitation', in Norman A. Martínez Gutiérrez (ed.), Serving the Rule of International Maritime Law: Essays in Honour of Professor David Joseph Attard (Routledge, 2010) ISBN 9780415563987
- 'Toward the Rule of Law in Afghanistan: The Constitutive Process', in John D. Montgomery and Dennis A. Rondinelli (eds.), Beyond Reconstruction in Afghanistan: Lessons from Development Experience (Palgrave Macmillan, 2004) ISBN 9781403965110 (won the 2004 Myres S. McDougal Prize in international law)
- 'Human Rights: A Global Common Interest', in Jean E. Krasno (ed.), The United Nations: Confronting the Challenges of a Global Society (Lynne Rienner Publishers, 2004) ISBN 9781588262554
- 'Challenging Sovereignty: India, TRIPS, and the WTO' (with Ulrich Camen), in John D. Montgomery and Nathan Glazer (eds.), Sovereignty Under Challenge: How Governments Respond (Routledge, 2002) ISBN 9781138514898
- 'Indigenous Knowledge as Intellectual Property', in John D. Montgomery and Alex Inkeles (eds.), Social Capital as a Policy Resource (Springer, 2001) ISBN 9780792372738
- 'The Circum-Mediterranean: From Clashing Civilizations to Transnational Arbitration', in John B. Hattendorf (ed.), Naval Strategy and Policy in the Mediterranean: Past, Present and Future (?Routledge, 2000) ISBN 9780714649917
- 'A Pivotal States Human Rights Strategy', in Robert S. Chase, Emily B. Hill and Paul Kennedy (eds.), The Pivotal States: A New Framework for U.S. Policy in the Developing World (W.W. Norton, 1999) ISBN 9780393046755
- 'The Indian National Human Rights Commission as a Value Creating Institution', in John D. Montgomery (ed.), Human Rights: Positive Policies in Asia and the Pacific Rim (Hollis Press, 1998) ISBN 9781884186097

=== Policy brief ===
- 'Algorithmic North: Weather, Security and International Law' (with Amanda H. Lynch) Geneva Centre for Security Policy Policy Brief No. 21 November 2025 ISBN 978-2-88947-440-0

== Organizations ==
Norchi is a Fellow of the Royal Geographical Society and a member of the American Polar Society (APS). He is a Fellow, and member of the United Nations Committee, of The Explorers Club and has carried The Explorers Club flag on expeditions in 1992, 1995, 1999, 2001, 2002 and 2019.

He is a member of the Director's Circle of the Portland Museum of Art, a member of the Propeller Club, Port of Portland Maine, of the Maine State Bar Association, of the Board of Directors of the Harvard Club in Maine and of the Harvard Club of New York City.

== Personal life ==
Norchi is married to Professor Amanda Lynch.
