= Stockwell (surname) =

English habitational surname

Stockwell is an English habitational name derived from various places named Stockwell, including Stockwell in Lambeth (Surrey) and Stockwell in Cowley (Gloucestershire). The name originates from the Old English words "stocc," meaning "tree trunk" or "stump," and "wella," meaning "well," "spring," or "stream." The surname is also occasionally spelled as Stokewell, Stokwelle, and Stokwell.

== People ==
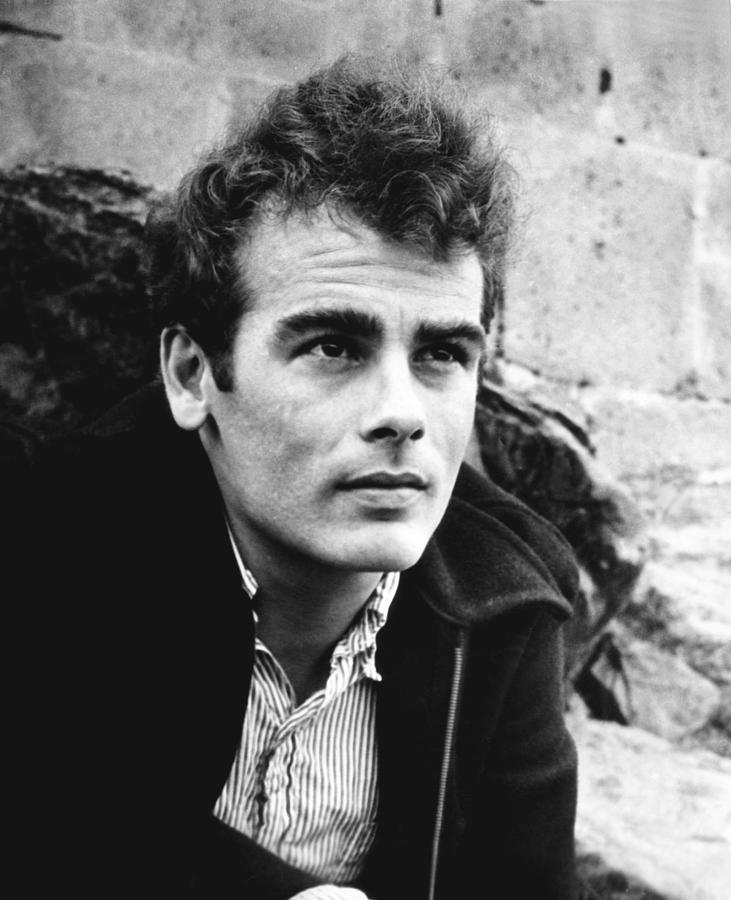
Dean Stockwell in publicity still for Rapture (1965)

- Anthony Stockwell, British historian
- Brent Stockwell, American biochemist
- Chris Stockwell (1957–2018), Canadian politician
- Clifford H. Stockwell (1897–1987), Canadian geologist
- Dean Stockwell (1936–2021), American actor
- Frank Stockwell (1928–2009), Irish sportsperson
- Guy Stockwell (1934–2002), American actor
- Harry Stockwell (1902–1984), American actor
- Hugh Stockwell (1903–1986), British general
- Ian Stockwell (1917–1998), British air force officer
- John Stockwell (CIA officer) (born 1937), American spy and activist
- John Stockwell (actor) (born 1961), American actor and director
- Mark Stockwell (born 1963), Australian swimmer
- Mick Stockwell (born 1965), English football player and manager
- Peter Stockwell, New Zealand air marshal

== Fictional characters ==
- Agent Stockwell, fictional character in the movie Marauders
- David Stockwell, fictional character in the television series Heartbeat
- Ernest Stockwell, fictional character in the video game Army of Two
- Hunt Stockwell, fictional character in the television series The A-Team
- Jim Stockwell, fictional character in the television series Queer as Folk

== Plants ==
- Stockwellia, a tree named for an Australian forest ranger
