= Kudro =

Kudro (Georgian: ყუდრო) is a vanished village in the Turkish part of the historical Samtskhe region. The settlement was located in the Posof District of Ardahan province, near the town of Posof.

== History ==
The Georgian place name Kudro (ყუდრო) or Mkudro (მყუდრო) means sheltered place. There are still villages named Kudro in Georgia today.

A small portion of the historical Samtskhe region where the village of Kudro is located is now within the borders of Turkey. The Ottomans completely captured the Samtskhe region and the village in 1578.

The village of Kudro was recorded as Kudura (قودورە) in the Ottoman land-survey register (mufassal defter) of 1595. Georgian Turkologist Sergi Jikia, who published this mufassal defter, states that this spelling of the village's name is related to Ottoman spelling rules. Kudura is recorded in this register as two settlements: Kudura-i Süfla (Lower Kudura) and Kudura-i Ulya (Upper Kudura). At that time, these settlements were within the Kuzey nahiye of Poshov liva, within the Vilayet-i Gürcistan. The population consisted of nine Christian households, and the heads of the households bore Georgian names. Wheat, barley, and millet were cultivated in the village, along with beekeeping and raising sheep and pigs.

Kudro village was also recorded as Kudura-i Süfla (Lower Kudura) and Kudura-i Ulya (Upper Kudura) in the Ottoman cebe defter of Çıldır Eyalet, covering the period 1694–1732, and held the same administrative position. In 1117 AH (1705/1706), the village held the same administrative status, with a revenue of 9,000 akçe, and was assigned to a man named Ali.

Georgian Turkologist Sergi Jikia, who published the Ottoman mufassal defter, states that the village of Kudro was spelled Kudra (Кудра) in Russian sources due to the influence of Turkish. According to Jikia, the German-born Russian administrator Karl Sissermann mentioned the Kudra outpost near Poshov in the early 1870s and wrote that there were 18 soldiers there. The fact that it was not listed as a village in the Poshov district in the 1886 Russian census indicates that Kudro or Kudra had ceased to be a village before that date.
