= TeRra (Live) =

Live album by Han Terra
- Released: January 2015
- Genres: classical, contemporary
- Label: Poly Music Co.
- From 6th century's ancient times to 21st century's kayageum music

TeRra (Live) is TeRra Han's first album released by Poly Music, in 2015.

== From 6 century's ancient times to the 21century's live Kayageum Music ==
TeRra (Live) is a live performance recordings of Han TeRra's Kayageum music for 15 years 2000-2015. It is representing Korean classical kayageum music from past to present in history of South Korea since 6C's. Such as Kayageum Sanjo, Byungchang which is National Intangible Heritage No.23 of Korea, Contemporary pieces for 21, 25 et.c strings kayageum, Electronic Music, Korean Samulnori improvisational music, Court music, Orchestral concerto.

== Musical crisis for 11 years ==
In 2015, Han resumed official her activity after period of musical crisis for 11 years with an ebook 'TeRra' written by the Jang Byung Wook who is a columnist in South Korea it published by The Korea Times. Coincidentally live album TeRra (Live) released which is containing her performance for 15 years.

== Track listing ==
No.	Title	Length
1.	"Lamentation of the 500 years"	05:20
2.	"Doraji variations(bell flower)"	04:36
3.	"Nawasawi"	07:06
4.	"Korean court music 'Dodeuri'"	07:58
5.	"Kayageum Sanjo, Kim Juk Pa School" (Sukhi Kang, Roland Breitenfelt)	15:00
6.	"Korean folk improvisational music for dance"	05:27
7.	"Song of Kyeongbok Palace, Concerto for 25string kayageum"	12:05
8.	"Nirmanakaya with electronics"	04:44
9.	"Gogocheonbyeon, singing accompanied with kayageum"	04:13

== Personnel ==
- Han Terra – Kayageum
- Seoul Metropolitan Korean traditional music orchestra
- Sukhi Kang
- Roland Breitenfelt
