= Journal of the Royal Asiatic Society =

- Discipline: Oriental studies
- Language: English

Publication details
- Former names: Transactions of the Royal Asiatic Society of Great Britain and Ireland; The Journal of the Royal Asiatic Society of Great Britain and Ireland
- History: 1824–present
- Publisher: Cambridge University Press for the Royal Asiatic Society of Great Britain and Ireland (United Kingdom)
- Frequency: Quarterly

Standard abbreviations
- ISO 4: J. R. Asiat. Soc.

Indexing
- ISSN: 1356-1863 (print); 1474-0591 (web)
- JSTOR: 13561863

Links
- Journal homepage; Journal information at Royal Asiatic Society of Great Britain and Ireland

The Journal of the Royal Asiatic Society is an academic journal which publishes articles on the history, archaeology, literature, language, religion and art of South Asia, the Middle East (together with North Africa and Ethiopia), Central Asia, East Asia and South-East Asia. It has been published by the Royal Asiatic Society of Great Britain and Ireland since 1834. The current editor is Daud Ali.

Years	Title
1824–1834	Transactions of the Royal Asiatic Society of Great Britain and Ireland
1835–1990	The Journal of the Royal Asiatic Society of Great Britain and Ireland
since 1991	Journal of the Royal Asiatic Society

== Publications ==
- Journal of the Royal Asiatic Society of Great Britain and Ireland, Volume 1. Contributor Royal Asiatic Society of Great Britain and Ireland. Cambridge University Press for the Royal Asiatic Society. 1834.
- Journal of the North-China Branch of the Royal Asiatic Society, Volume 11. Contributor Royal Asiatic Society of Great Britain and Ireland. North-China Branch. The Branch. 1877.
- Royal Asiatic Society of Great Britain and Ireland. North China Branch, Shanghai (1877). Journal of the North China Branch of the Royal Asiatic Society, Volumes 11-12. Kelly & Walsh. Archived from the original on 11 November 2009.
- Journal of the Royal Asiatic Society of Great Britain & Ireland, Volume 17. Contributor Royal Asiatic Society of Great Britain and Ireland. Cambridge University Press for the Royal Asiatic Society. 1885.
- Journal of the Royal Asiatic Society of Great Britain & Ireland, Volume 19. Contributor Royal Asiatic Society of Great Britain and Ireland. Cambridge University Press for the Royal Asiatic Society. 1887.
- Royal Asiatic Society of Great Britain and Ireland. North China Branch, Shanghai (1890). Journal of the North China Branch of the Royal Asiatic Society, Volume 24. Contributor China Branch of the Royal Asiatic Society. Kelly & Walsh.
- Journal of the China Branch of the Royal Asiatic Society for the Year ..., Volumes 24-25. Contributor Royal Asiatic Society of Great Britain and Ireland. China Branch. The Branch. 1890.
- Journal of the North-China Branch of the Royal Asiatic Society, Volumes 26-27. Contributor Royal Asiatic Society of Great Britain and Ireland. North-China Branch. The Branch. 1894.
- Royal Asiatic Society of Great Britain and Ireland. North China Branch, Shanghai (1894). Journal of the North China Branch of the Royal Asiatic Society, Volumes 26-27. Kelly & Walsh.
- Royal Asiatic Society of Great Britain and Ireland. North China Branch, Shanghai, China Branch of the Royal Asiatic Society, Royal Asiatic Society of Great Britain and Ireland. China Branch, Shanghai Literary and Scientific Society (1898). Journal of the North China Branch of the Royal Asiatic Society, Volumes 28-29. Kelly & Walsh.
- Journal of the North-China Branch of the Royal Asiatic Society, Volume 29. Contributor Royal Asiatic Society of Great Britain and Ireland. North-China Branch. The Branch. 1895.
- Journal of the China Branch of the Royal Asiatic Society for the Year ..., Volume 29. Contributor Royal Asiatic Society of Great Britain and Ireland. China Branch. The Branch. 1895.
- Journal of the China Branch of the Royal Asiatic Society for the Year ..., Volume 30, Issue 1. Contributor Royal Asiatic Society of Great Britain and Ireland. China Branch. The Branch. 1897.
- Journal of the Straits Branch of the Royal Asiatic Society, Volumes 31-33. Contributor Royal Asiatic Society of Great Britain and Ireland. Straits Branch. Singapore: Printed At The American Mission Press. 1898.
- Transactions of the Royal Asiatic Society of Great Britain and Ireland, Volume 1. Parbury. 1827.
- Journal of the Royal Asiatic Society of Great Britain & Ireland. 1965.
