= Amanda Lynch =

Atmospheric scientist

- Education: Monash University (B.Sc. hons); University of Melbourne (Ph.D.)
- Spouse: Charles H. Norchi
- Honors: Fellow of the American Meteorological Society; Fellow of the Australian Academy of Technological Sciences and Engineering; Fellow of the Norwegian Scientific Academy for Polar Research; Priestley Medal of the Australian Meteorological and Oceanographic Society

Amanda H. Lynch is an Australian atmospheric scientist and Sloan Lindemann and George Lindemann, Jr. Distinguished Professor of Environment and Society and Professor of Earth, Environmental and Planetary Sciences at Brown University. She was founding Director of the Institute at Brown for Environment and Society in 2014. She is an expert in polar climate system modelling, indigenous environmental knowledge and climate policy analysis.

Lynch is a Fellow of the American Meteorological Society, the Australian Academy of Technological Sciences and Engineering and the Norwegian Scientific Academy for Polar Research.

== Career ==
After receiving a B.Sc. in Applied Mathematics with First Class Honours at Monash University, Lynch earned her Ph.D. in Atmospheric Sciences from the University of Melbourne in 1993, Lynch developed the first Arctic regional climate system model. In 2003, while working at the University of Colorado, Lynch was granted a Federation Fellowship by the Australian Research Council.

After working at Monash University, she joined Brown University in 2011 as a professor of earth, environmental and planetary sciences. While at the University in 2013, Lynch was named a chief editor of the Weather, Climate and Society journal and was named a Fellow of the American Meteorological Society. She was elected a Fellow of the World Academy of Art and Science in 2016. In 2017, Lynch was elected a Fellow of the Norwegian Scientific Academy for Polar Research.

Lynch is chair of the Research Board of the United Nations World Meteorological Organization (WMO). She was Vice-chair of the Joint Scientific Committee of the World Climate Research Programme 2017-2019 and was a member of the Scientific Committee of the 2023 WCRP Open Science Conference, the first such Conference held in Africa. In 2025, Lynch was appointed Co-Chair of the newly-formed WMO Joint Advisory Group on Artificial Intelligence which is tasked with increasing WMO development and use of AI technologies in meteorology and hydrology.

Lynch was awarded the Priestley Medal of the Australian Meteorological and Oceanographic Society in 2007, and the Myres S. McDougal Prize in International Law in 2022.

== Personal life ==
Lynch is married to Professor Charles H. Norchi.

She is a Fellow of The Explorers Club. She is a member of the Director’s Circle of the Portland Museum of Art (PMA).
