= Giorgi Tsereteli (orientalist) =

Georgian scientist and historian (1904 – 1973)

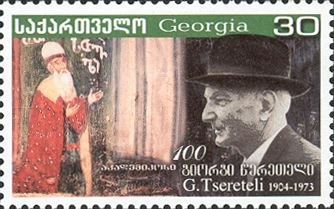
Stamp of Georgia, 2004

Giorgi (George) V. Tsereteli FRAS (alternately transliterated as Cereteli) (Georgian: გიორგი წერეთელი; 8 October 1904 – 9 September 1973) was a Georgian scientist and public benefactor, founder of the well-known Georgian scientific school of Oriental Studies. He founded both the Faculty of Oriental Studies of the Tbilisi State University (TSU) the Institute of Oriental Studies of the Georgian National Academy of Sciences (GNAS), the latter of which he was the first Director. He was also an Academician of GNAS, a Meritorious Scientific Worker of Georgia, a Doctor of Philological Sciences and a Professor.

== Life and works ==
Giorgi Tsereteli was born in Tianeti, Eastern Georgia. In 1927, he graduated from the Tbilisi State University (TSU). From 1928 to 1931, he was a Post-Graduate Student at the Academy of Sciences of Soviet Union (since 1991 - Russian Academy of Science), and from 1931 to 1933, he held the position of Associate Professor at the Leningrad (now St.Petersburg) State Institute of Living Oriental Languages. Between 1933 and 1973 he was Associate Professor (1933-1942) and Professor (1942-1973) of the Tbilisi State University. 1933-1937 - Senior Research Fellow of the State Museum of Georgia. In 1940-1960 Tsereteli was a Head of the Department of Oriental Languages of the Institute of Linguistics of the Georgian Academy of Sciences (GAS). In 1942 he received a degree of the Doctor of Philological Sciences and scientific title of Professor.

In 1945 Tsereteli was a founder of the Faculty of Oriental Studies of TSU, In 1945 he led the Department of Semitic studies at the TSU Faculty of Oriental Studies which he founded; a position he held until 1973. In 1946 he was elected as Academician (Full Member) of the Georgian National Academy of Sciences (GNAS). In 1957-1967 he was Academician-Secretary (Chairman) of the Department of Social Sciences of GNAS, in 1967-1970 Vice-President of GNAS, in 1970-1973 member of the Presidium of the Academy. For 13 years he was the Director of the Oriental Studies of GNAS which he also founded. In 1959, Giorgi Tsereteli was invited by the Polish Academy of Sciences and the University of Warsaw to Poland with academician Sergi Jikia to give lectures. In 1968 he was elected as Academician of the Academy of Sciences of Soviet Union (now Russian Academy of Science). He was also an Honorary Member of the Royal Asiatic Society of the Great Britain and Ireland (1964) and an Honorary Member of the Society of Orientalists of Poland (1966).

Main fields of scientific activity of Giorgi Tsereteli were: Arabic dialects of the Central Asia, Arabic linguistics and folklore, Hebrew and Aramaic studies, history of old languages of the Near East, history of writing systems, history of the Georgian script, source studies of the history of Georgia and the Caucasus, Rustvelology, questions of theoretical linguistics, etc. He was author of more than 100 important scientific-research works, among them 10 monographs.

Giorgi Tsereteli died in 1973, in Tbilisi. He is buried in the garden of the Tbilisi State University.

== Some of main scientific works ==
- "The Urartian inscriptions of the State Museum of Georgia" (a monograph), Tbilisi, 1939, 110 pp. (in Georgian, Russian and English).
- "The Armazi inscription of the period of Mithridats the Iberian" – Proceedings of the XXV International Congress of Orientalists, Moscow, 1962, pp. 374–378 (in Russian, English summary).
- "The Bilingual inscriptions from Armazi" (a monograph), Tbilisi, 1941, 80 pp. (in Russian, English summary).
- "Arabic Dialects of the Central Asia. Bukhara Dialect" (a monograph), Tbilisi, 1956, 343 pp. (in Russian, English summary).
- "The ancient Georgian inscriptions from Palestine" (a monograph), Tbilisi, 1960, 110 pp. (in Georgian and English).
- "The Meter and Rhyme in Shota Rustaveli's Poem "The Man in the Panther's Skin" (a monograph) – "The Meter and Rhyme in "The Man in the Panther's Skin"". Edited by G.V. Tsereteli, Tbilisi, 1973, pp. 2-120 (in Georgian).
- "The influence of the Tajik language on the vocalism of Central Asian Arabic dialects" – BSOAS, vol. XXXIII, Part 1, London, 1970, pp. 167–170.
- "The Verbal Particle m/mi in Bukhara Arabic" – "Folia Orientalia", vol. XII, 1970, pp. 29–35.

== See also ==
- List of Georgians
- Georgian Academy of Sciences
- Tbilisi State University
