= Francis Robinson =

British historian (born 1944)

Francis Christopher Rowland Robinson CBE, DL, FRAS (born 23 November 1944 in Barnet) is a British historian and academic who specialises in the history of South Asia and Islam. Since 1990, he has been Professor of History of South Asia at the University of London. He has twice been president of the Royal Asiatic Society: from 1997 to 2000, and from 2003 to 2006.

== Early life and education ==
Robinson was educated at Bexhill County Grammar School for Boys and Trinity College, Cambridge, where he completed his MA and PhD degrees, the latter in 1970.

== Academic career ==
Robinson's research interests have focused on the Muslim world, with particular emphasis the Muslims of South Asia, Muslim responses to modernity, learned and holy families, and religious and political change. He has written several books on the Islamic World, including Atlas of the Islamic World Since 1500 (1982), Islam and Muslim History in South Asia (2000), The Ulama of Farangi Mahall and Islamic Culture in South Asia (2001), The Mughal Emperors (2007), and Islam, South Asia, and the West (2007), Jamal Mian: The Life of Maulana Jamaluddin Abdul Wahab of Farangi Mahall, 1919-2012 (2017), and The Muslim World in Modern South Asia: Power, Authority, Knowledge (2020).

Robinson served as president of the Royal Asiatic Society from 1997 to 2000 and 2003 to 2006.

Robinson was the vice-principal of Royal Holloway, University of London, from 1997 to 2004. He had previously served as the head of the History Department at the college from 1990 to 1996.

Robinson has also been a visiting professor at Oxford University, the University of Chicago, and the University of Washington.

== Honours ==
He received a CBE in 2006 for his services to higher education and his research into the history of Islam.
