= Cho Su-Hwang =

South Korean traditional musician (born 1996)

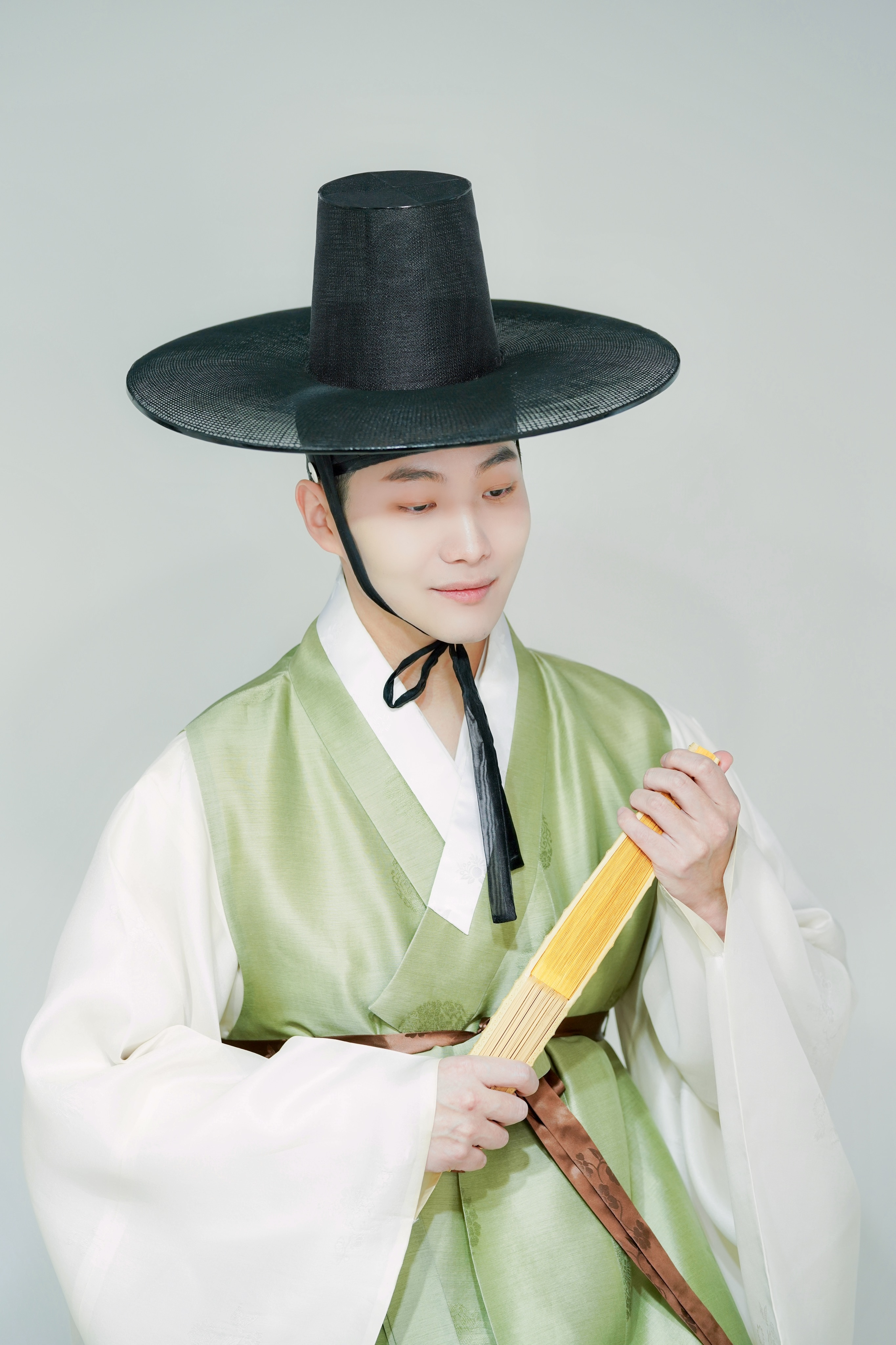
- Education: Seoul National University (B.A.)
- Employer: National Theater of Korea
- Title: Certified Successor (Transmitter) of National Intangible Cultural Heritage 'Pansori'
- Awards: Presidential Award of the Republic of Korea, Prime Minister Award

Cho Su-Hwang, FRAI, FRAS, (Korean: 조수황; born 19 September 1996) is a South Korean Pansori vocalist. He previously served as a full-time member of the National Changgeuk Company of Korea, the resident troupe of the National Theater of Korea. He is a certified transmitter of Korea's National Intangible Cultural Heritage.

== Career ==
In November 2021, Cho presented a solo recital, Nature's Comfort: Four Seasons with Su-Hwang Cho, at the Byeoloreum Theater of the National Theater of Korea. In June 2022, he performed at the Sofia Music Weeks International Festival in Bulgaria with cellist Anatoli Krastev. On 9 January 2024, Cho attended the President's New Year's gathering with cultural and artistic figures held at the Seoul Arts Center in Seoul. In July 2026, Cho accepted an invitation to join the Recording Academy, the organisation responsible for the Grammy Awards, and became a Voting Member.

== Recognition ==
In December 2023, Minister of Culture, Sports and Tourism Yu In-chon referred to Cho as a "national representative artist", as reported by Chosun Ilbo. Major South Korean media outlets have referred to Cho as a pansori master singer and traditional musician representing Korea. Edaily called him “a pansori master singer representing Korea”, while the Seoul Shinmun described him as “a Korean traditional musician and master singer representing Korea”.

== Awards ==
- 2013 – Minister of Culture, Sports and Tourism Award
- 2014 – Gold Prize (Student Division), Dong-A Korean Traditional Music Competition (pansori)
- 2016 – Gold Prize (General Division), Dong-A Korean Traditional Music Competition (pansori)
- 2018 – Prime Minister of the Republic of Korea Award
- 2022 – Grand Prize (Presidential Award), National Namdo Minyo Competition (Master Singer Division)
- 2023 – Commendation Award from the National Assembly Culture, Sports and Tourism Committee (Chairman's Citation)

== Affiliations ==
- Fellow, Royal Society of Arts (FRSA)
- Fellow, Royal Asiatic Society of Great Britain and Ireland (FRAS)
