= James J. Busuttil =

American lawyer, legal academic and company director

- Born: 1958 (age 67–68); New York, United States
- Education: Harvard University; New York University; Linacre College, Oxford
- Occupations: Lawyer, legal academic, company director
- Notable work: Naval Weapons Systems and the Contemporary Law of War (1998) A Taste of Armageddon: The Law of Armed Conflict as Applied to Cyberwar (1999) 'Slay Them Wherever You Find Them': Humanitarian Law in Islam (1991)

James J. Busuttil FRSA FRAS FRGS FIoD is an American attorney, law academic and company director. He worked at the United States Department of State in counterterrorism and then in private financial law in New York City, before moving to Europe where he was an academic, NGO leader and Member of the Permanent Court of Arbitration in The Hague. Later, he became a director and then Chairman of a public company based in Silicon Valley.

== Early life and education ==
Busuttil was born in New York in 1958. He is the eldest child of Joseph M. and Pauline Busuttil. He is of Maltese ancestry. He grew up in the Jamaica Estates neighborhood of Queens, New York.

His mother was a Registered Nurse (RN), educated at St. Luke's Hospital, Malta. His father was a successful small businessman and philanthropist. Joseph M. Busuttil was knighted four times, by Pope Pius XII, by Pope John XXIII and by Pope Paul VI (twice) for his services to charity, in particular his decades-long financial support of the children's homes of Malta and Gozo and of the Cana Movement, and for his services as personal envoy of Popes John XXIII and Paul VI to negotiate the resolution of Church-State issues in Malta in the 1960s and 1970s. Joseph M. Busuttil was made a Knight of the Order of Saint Gregory the Great, a Knight of the Order of Saint Sylvester, a Knight of the Sovereign Military Order of Malta and a Knight of the Order of the Holy Sepulchre. Pauline Busuttil was made a Dame of the Order of the Holy Sepulchre for her own charitable works.

Busuttil attended Regis High School in New York City from 1972 to 1976. At graduation, he received the New York State Regents Scholarship and the New York State Governor's Citation.

He attended Harvard College from 1976 to 1979 to study for an A.B. degree, graduating in three years instead of the usual four. While at Harvard, he lived in Thayer Hall and Leverett House. He studied Government, in particular international relations. Among his Harvard classmates were Caroline Kennedy, Phil Murphy and Neil deGrasse Tyson. Busuttil graduated cum laude. He had received the Harvard College Scholarship.

Busuttil attended New York University School of Law from 1979 to 1982 to study for the Juris Doctor (J.D.). There, he focused his studies on public international law, taking almost all the postgraduate courses available at that time for the Master of Law (LL.M.) in International Law. For his grades in these LL.M. courses, he was awarded the Clyde W. Eagleton Graduate Award in International Law in spite of being a J.D. student. In addition, at graduation, he was awarded the Order of the Coif, which N.Y.U. School of Law awards to no more than the top 10 of its graduates each year. While still a student, in July 1982 he published his first scholarly article, an analysis of the Bonn Declaration on International Terrorism.

== Law practice ==
=== Department of State ===
Busuttil joined the U.S. Department of State's Office of the Legal Adviser in 1982. He was appointed an Attorney-Adviser in the Office of the Assistant Legal Adviser for Law Enforcement and Intelligence Affairs (L/LEI). He acted as the legal counsel to the Office for Combatting Terrorism, coordinated the Department of State position on reform of the U.S. federal criminal code, negotiated international extradition treaties, in particular with Switzerland, where he was Head of Delegation, Italy and Jamaica, and supervised extradition cases.

=== Curtis, Mallet-Prevost, Colt and Mosle ===
After service at the State Department, Busuttil joined Curtis, Mallet-Prevost, Colt & Mosle in their New York City office, first on Wall Street and later on Park Avenue. He worked in real estate development, corporate law and litigation, with an international emphasis, and negotiation of international joint venture agreements. Busuttil worked on cases involving the U.S. Foreign Sovereign Immunities Act and act of state issues. He assisted in the preparation of the Memorial in the Continental Shelf (Tunisia/Libyan Arab Jamahiriya) Case and worked on the Amoco Cadiz litigation.

=== Shearman and Sterling ===
Busuttil then joined Shearman & Sterling in their office in the Citicorp Center. There he was involved in various aspects of private financing, including alternative energy project financings. He represented the Bank Advisory Group for Nicaragua's sovereign debt restructuring and handled many private sector Mexican debt restructures.

=== NOAA ===
After over two years of private law practice in Manhattan, Busuttil returned in 1986 to public service as Special Assistant to the General Counsel of the National Oceanic and Atmospheric Administration (NOAA). His special responsibility was for international affairs and legislation, including international whaling, coastal zone management, fisheries allocation and NOAA's legislative program. As a delegate to the International Whaling Commission's (IWC) 38th Meeting, he participated in the lobbying for and adoption of the global moratorium on commercial whaling.

=== Porter & Travers (now King & Spalding) ===
With colleagues from Shearman & Sterling, Busuttil was a founder of Porter & Travers, a boutique law firm specializing in representing banks as lenders. He represented banks and financial institutions based in the United States and other countries, such as Citibank and Rabobank, in private sector financing of domestic and international projects. After he left, Porter & Travers was acquired, to become the New York City branch of King & Spalding.

== Academic work and university teaching ==
=== Oxford DPhil ===
In 1990, Busuttil matriculated at Linacre College of the University of Oxford, to study for a Doctor of Philosophy (DPhil) in public international law. His supervisor was Professor Sir Ian Brownlie, Chichele Professor of Public International Law at All Souls College. While at Oxford, Busuttil was elected a Member of the Governing Body of his college, a member of the Standing Committee of the Oxford University Strategic Studies Group and a Life Member of the Oxford Union Society.

His DPhil thesis, "Naval Weapons Systems and the Contemporary Law of War: Selected Topics", was awarded the 1996 Dasturzada Dr. Jal Pavry Memorial Prize for best Doctoral or Master's thesis in Law, Modern History or Social Studies on a subject in the area of international peace and understanding. An edited and updated version was later published by Clarendon Press, the imprint for Oxford University Press publications of particular academic importance. This work sold out its 400-copy press-run, which is unusual for academic books. It remains available as a print on demand title. This book was cited by the United States in its submission to the International Court of Justice in the Oil Platforms case.

While working on his DPhil, Busuttil wrote the first analysis in English of the Islamic approach to the laws of war, using the Sharia as his primary source material.

=== University of Essex Human Rights Centre ===
From Oxford, Busuttil joined the Human Rights Centre of the Department of Law of the University of Essex in 1992. There he organized and taught graduate seminars in economic, social and cultural human rights and in the international law of armed conflict, and created the world's first human rights Practicum, which introduced human rights graduate students to the practical issues of human rights work, including running an NGO, fact-finding and missions, country reports and individual applications. Busuttil was Faculty Adviser to the World Championship Team in the Concours Jean Pictet du Droit Humanitaire in 1993.

=== British Institute of Human Rights ===
In 1995, Busuttil became the first full-time Director of the British Institute of Human Rights (BIHR). The BIHR was recognized by the Council of Europe as the United Kingdom's national human rights institute. Busuttil managed its day-to-day operations, controlled its strategic development and public profile, devised, organized and directed conferences, seminars and workshops and organized public lectures including the Institute's Human Rights Public lecture series and annual Paul Sieghart Memorial Lecture. From 1998 to 2005, he edited the Human Rights Case Digest, published by Brill. At the same time, Busuttil was appointed a Research Fellow in International Human Rights Law at King's College London School of Law.

=== Institute of Social Studies ===
Busuttil was appointed Associate Professor of International Law and Organization at the Institute of Social Studies in The Hague in 1998. He taught in six graduate programs: Masters of Law (LL.M.) in International Law and Organization; Master's (M.A.) in Development Studies; Human Rights Diploma; International Law and Sustainable Development Diploma; Globalization and Development Diploma; and Development, Law and Social Justice Diploma. In addition, he had substantial administrative responsibilities, both within his disciplinary area and Institute-wide. Busuttil was the External examiner at the Vrije Universiteit Amsterdam for its LL.M. in International Business Law and for the University of Amsterdam's LL.M. in International Law.

While at the I.S.S., he wrote the first article on the legal regulation of cyberwar and an article on how to effectively respond to religious fundamentalism, and edited two books, Bridge or Barrier: Religion, Violence and Visions for Peace and The Freedom to Do God's Will: Religious Fundamentalism and Social Change.

=== International Criminal Tribunal for the former Yugoslavia ===
From 2002 to 2003, Busuttil took a sabbatical from teaching. He headed the Legal Reference Project in the Office of the Prosecutor (OTP) of the International Criminal Tribunal for the former Yugoslavia (ICTY). He coordinated, directed and edited an analysis of the entire case law of the ICTY (over 5,000 decisions to that date). The five-person team he headed produced the first comprehensive collection and analysis of the Tribunal's procedural law and substantive law on war crimes, crimes against humanity and genocide.

=== University of London ===
For more than ten years starting in 2004, Busuttil was Director of the University of London Postgraduate Laws Program. He was responsible for the setting up, development, delivery and management of the Masters of Law (LL.M.), Postgraduate Diploma (PG Dip.) in Law and Postgraduate Certificate (PG Cert.) in Law, offered via the University of London's International Programs. Busuttil provided academic direction and leadership (including the recruitment of course study guide authors and the creation of appropriate quality assurance mechanisms), took strategic decisions in relation to the delivery of this postgraduate Program, developed marketing strategies and coordinated 60 courses and 3,000 students in more than 150 countries.

During this time, Busuttil was appointed an Honorary Professor at the Faculty of Laws of University College London (UCL). Middlesex University's Department of Law appointed him an Honorary Visiting Professor. He was also on the staff of the School of Law of Queen Mary University of London (QMUL).

== Personal information ==
Busuttil has a son, Daniel Busuttil, who is a software engineer in Montreal, Canada, and a daughter.

Busuttil has been a member of the Harvard Club of New York City since 1979. He was elected a Fellow of The Explorers Club in 1990, for his work in Afghanistan and the border area of Pakistan. He was elected a Fellow of the Royal Geographical Society (RGS) in 1990, a Fellow of the Institute of Directors (IoD) in 1995, a Fellow of the Royal Society of Arts (RSA) in 1996 and a Fellow of the Royal Asiatic Society of Great Britain and Ireland (RAS) in 2017.

Busuttil was a member of Rotary Club La Valette Malta 2006–2018 and the Royal Malta Yacht Club 2011–2018.
