= Gagok =

Genre of traditional Korean vocal music

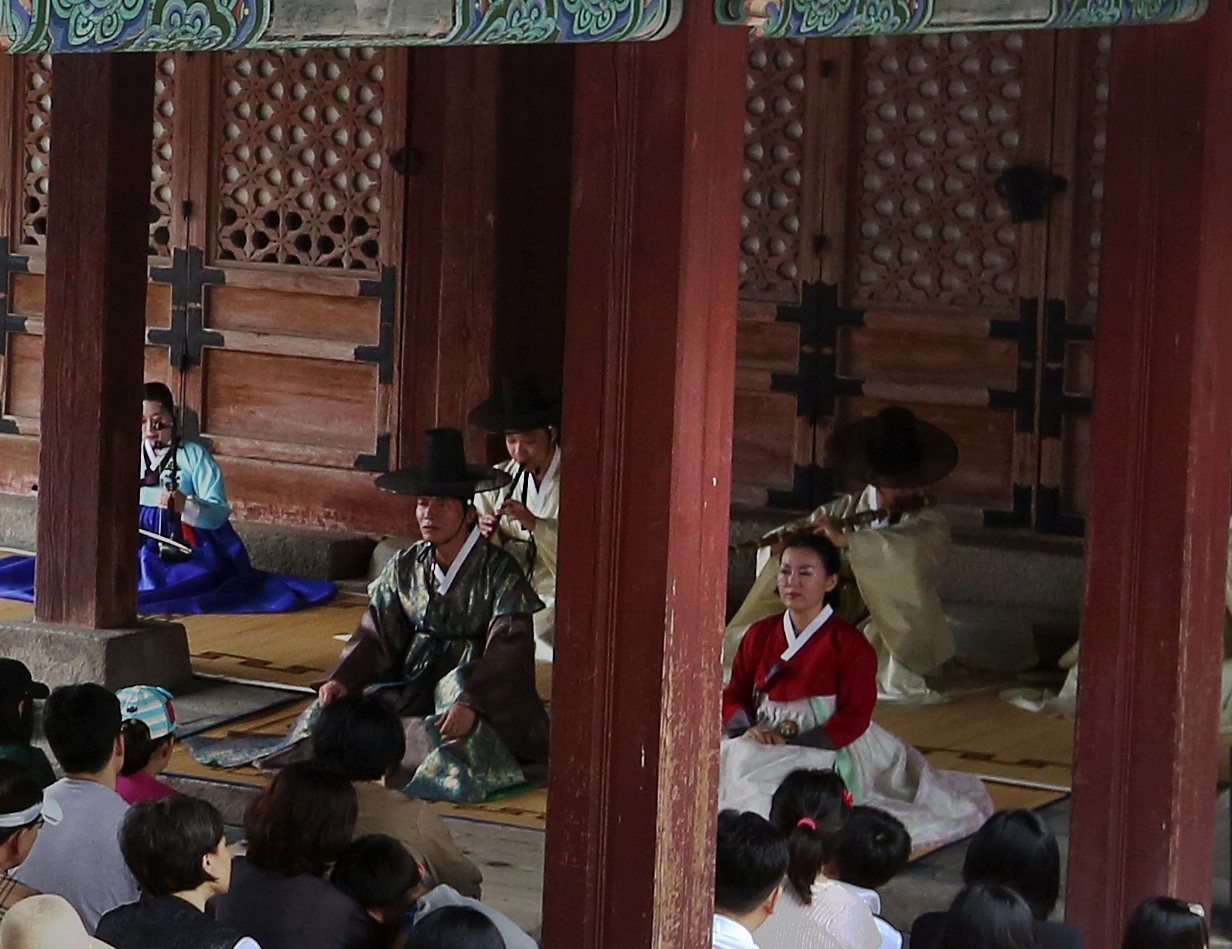

Korean name
- Hangul: 가곡
- Hanja: 歌曲
- RR: gagok
- MR: kagok

Gagok (Korean: 가곡; Hanja: 歌曲) is a genre of traditional Korean vocal music, derived from jeong-ak, for mixed female and male voices. Its origins date back to the sijo sung poetry enjoyed by the aristocracy in the Goryeo period (10th-14th century). The genre evolved over time, reaching its current form (sakdaeyeop) in the late Joseon dynasty. Slower styles, such as mandaeyeop and jungdaeyeop have now disappeared. Gagok is considered one of the most refined forms of Korean court music and was designated a national cultural heritage in the 1960s and an UNESCO intangible heritage in 2010.

== Musical characteristics ==
Gagok is performed by male singers (namchang) and female singers (yeochang), either solo or in duets. Vocal lines are characterized by very long vowels, few syllables and a range limited to about two octaves. Songs are structured in multiple sections combining vocal and instrumental parts. The repertoire includes 41 compositions, collectively known as Mannyon changhwanjigo (“Song of Long-Lived Joy”), with 26 pieces for male voices and 15 for female ones. Pieces are performed in different modalities conveying varying emotions: pyeongjo (peaceful), ujo (energetic), and gyemyeonjo (melancholic).

== Instrumentation ==
Accompaniments and interludes are played by a small ensemble of traditional Korean musical instruments. The accompaniment features a small ensemble of traditional instruments: gayageum or geomungo (zithers), daegeum or sogeum (flutes), haegeum (two-stringed zither), piri (bamboo oboe), and janggu (double-headed drum). The balance between voice and instruments is a defining feature of the genre.

== Modern developments ==
In the 20th century, a “Modern gagok” style emerged, influenced by Western music, particularly the German lied. During the Japanese colonial period (1910-1945), singing in Korean became a means of asserting national identity. one of the first modern pieces, “Bongseonhwa” (1920) by Hong Nan-pa, became a symbol of resistance. After liberation, the genre continued to evolve amid political and cultural tensions, maintaining a central role in Shaping Korean musical identity.
