= Daud Ali =

American historian of Indian descent

- Born: 3 March 1964 (age 62); Kolkata, India
- Scientific career
- Workplaces: School of Oriental and African Studies; University of Pennsylvania

Daud Ali (born 3 March 1964) is an American historian of Indian descent, born in Calcutta, India. He is currently associate professor of South Asian history at the University of Pennsylvania and the editor of the Journal of the Royal Asiatic Society. He is a scholar focusing on Pre-Mughal South Asia.

Ali obtained a Bachelor of Arts degree in English literature and religious studies at the College of William & Mary and then a Master of Arts degree in the history of religions at the University of Chicago Divinity School. At Chicago he was a student of Ronald Inden. After his receiving his Ph.D. from the Department of History at the University of Chicago, he taught history for fourteen years at the School of Oriental and African Studies in London. Since 2009, he has been at the University of Pennsylvania.

Ali's interests range widely over the history South Asia as a whole, covering themes such as courtly protocol, gardens, gastronomy, war and violence. His analysis of feudalism and the historiography of the medieval, in particular his critique of B. D. Chattopadhyaya, have been particularly influential.

== Scholarly works ==
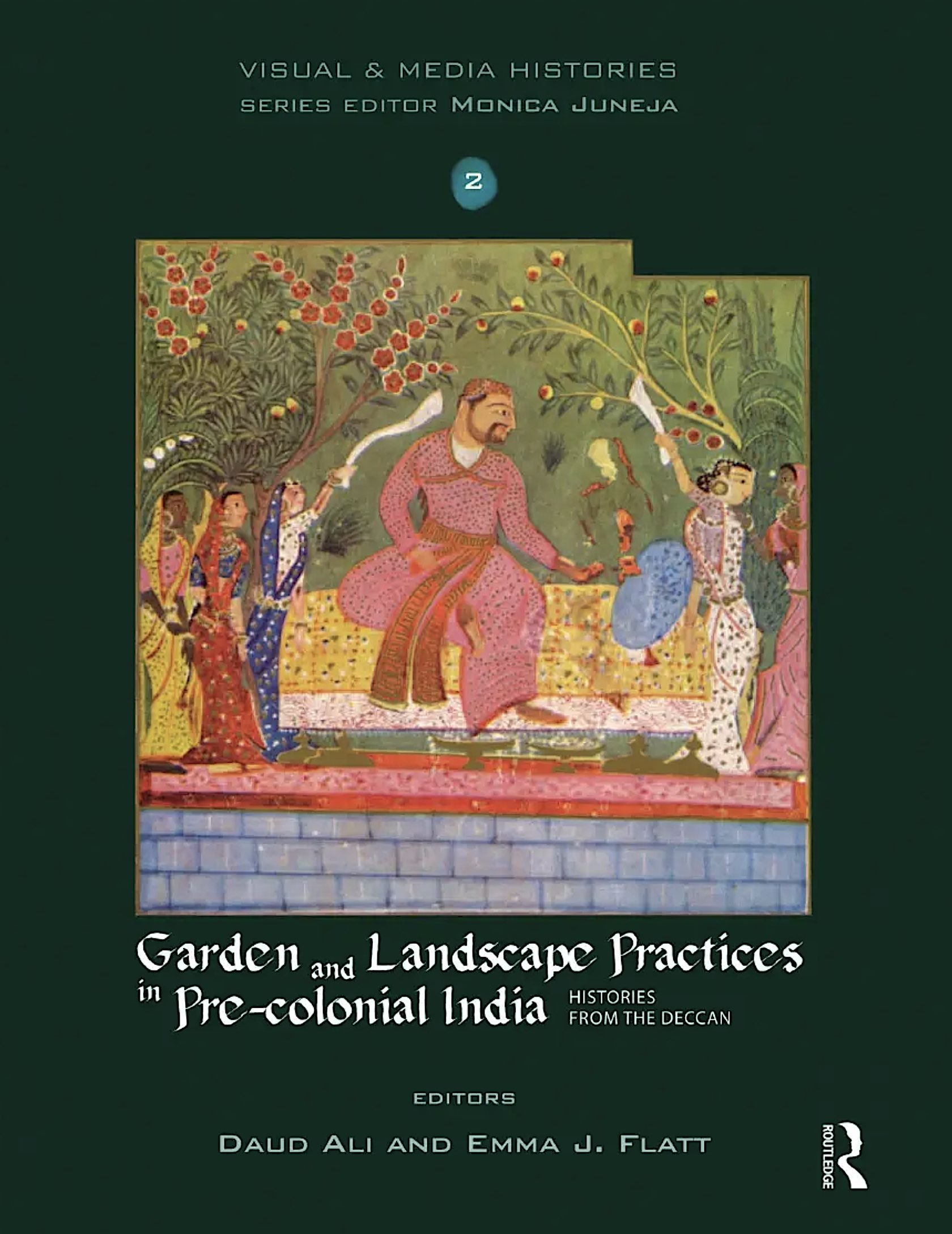
Cover of Garden and Landscape Practices in Pre-colonial India, edited by Daud Ali and Emma Flatt and publish by Routledge in 2011.

=== Books ===
- Ali, Daud (1999). Invoking the Past: the Uses of History in South Asia. Delhi: Oxford University Press. ISBN 9780195649789.
- Ali, Daud; Inden, Ronald; Walters, Jonathan (15 May 2000). Querying the Medieval: The History of Practice in South Asia. New York: Oxford University Press. ISBN 9780195352436.
- Ali, Daud (24 June 2004). Courtly Culture and Political Life in Early Medieval India. Cambridge University Press. ISBN 9780521816274.
- Ali, Daud; Pandian, Anand, eds. (2010). Ethical Life in South Asia. Indiana University Press. ISBN 9780253355287.
- Ali, Daud; Sengupta, Indra, eds. (2011). Knowledge Production, Pedagogy and Institutions in Colonial India. New York: Palgrave Macmillan. ISBN 9781349295180.
- Ali, Daud; Flatt, Emma, eds. (29 November 2020). Garden and Landscape Practices in Precolonial India: Histories from the Deccan. London: Taylor & Francis. ISBN 9781000365672.

=== Articles ===
- Ali, Daud (2012). "The Historiography of the Medieval in South Asia". Journal of the Royal Asiatic Society. 22 (1): 7–12. ISSN 1356-1863. JSTOR 41490370.
- Ali, Daud (2014). "The Idea of the Medieval in the Writing of South Asian History: Contexts, Methods and Politics". Social History. 39 (3): 382–407. doi:10.1080/03071022.2014.942521. ISSN 0307-1022. JSTOR 24246490.
- Ali, Daud (2016). "Bhoja's Mechanical Garden: Translating Wonder Across the Indian Ocean, Circa 800–1100 Ce". History of Religions. 55 (4): 460–493. doi:10.1086/685573. ISSN 0018-2710. JSTOR 26548111.
- Ali, Daud (2011). "Rethinking the History of the "Kāma" World in Early India". Journal of Indian Philosophy. 39 (1): 1–13. doi:10.1007/s10781-010-9115-7. ISSN 0022-1791. JSTOR 23884104.
- Ali, Daud (2007). "The Service Retinues of the Chola Court: A Study of the Term Veḷam in Tamil Inscriptions". Bulletin of the School of Oriental and African Studies, University of London. 70 (3): 487–509. doi:10.1017/S0041977X0700081X. ISSN 0041-977X. JSTOR 40378936.
- Ali, Daud (2013-04-01). "Temporality, Narration and the Problem of History: A View from Western India c. 1100–1400". The Indian Economic & Social History Review. 50 (2): 237–259. doi:10.1177/0019464613487120. ISSN 0019-4646.
- Ali, Daud (2023-07-03). "From the Interstices of History: Rethinking Regional Polity in North India and the Deccan, 14th–16th Centuries". South Asian Studies. 39 (2): 128–133. doi:10.1080/02666030.2023.2287817. ISSN 0266-6030.
- Ali, Daud (1998). "Technologies of the Self: Courtly Artifice and Monastic Discipline in Early India". Journal of the Economic and Social History of the Orient. 41 (2): 159–184. doi:10.1163/1568520982601322. ISSN 0022-4995. JSTOR 3632263.
- Ali, Daud (2017). "Cynthia Talbot. The Last Hindu Emperor: Prithviraj Chauhan and the Indian Past, 1200–2000". The American Historical Review. 122 (3): 813–814. doi:10.1093/ahr/122.3.813.
- Ali, Daud; Flatt, Emma J. (2017-02-01). "Friendship in Indian History: Introduction". Studies in History. 33 (1): 1–6. doi:10.1177/0257643016677396. ISSN 0257-6430.
- Ali, Daud (2021). "Rethinking Early Medieval India: A Reader. Edited by Upinder Singh". Journal of the American Oriental Society. 134 (1). doi:10.7817/jameroriesoci.134.1.0138.
- Ali, Daud (2021-07-03). "Towards a History of Courtly Emotions in Early Medieval India, c. 300–700 CE". South Asian History and Culture. 12 ((2–3)): 129–145. doi:10.1080/19472498.2021.1889797. ISSN 1947-2498.
- Ali, Daud (2014). "The Idea of the Medieval in the Writing of South Asian History: Contexts, Methods and Politics". Social History. 39 (3): 382–407. doi:10.1080/03071022.2014.942521. ISSN 0307-1022. JSTOR 24246490.
