= Michael Ridley (cricketer) =

English cricketer

Personal information
- Full name: Robert Michael Ridley
- Born: 8 January 1947 (age 79); Oxford, Oxfordshire, England
- Batting: Right-handed
- Bowling: Right-arm medium

Domestic team information
- Years: Team
- 1967–1970: Oxford University
- 1968: Ireland
- 1972–1973: Berkshire

Career statistics
Competition	First-class
Matches	23
Runs scored	994
Batting average	24.24
100s/50s	–/8
Top score	79
Balls bowled	6
Wickets	0
Bowling average	–
5 wickets in innings	–
10 wickets in match	–
Best bowling	–
Catches/stumpings	6/–
- Source: Cricinfo, 2 November 2018

Robert Michael Ridley (born 8 January 1947) is a former English first-class cricketer.

Ridley was born at Oxford in January 1947. He was later educated at Clifton College, before going up to St Edmund Hall, Oxford. While studying at Oxford, Ridley made his debut in first-class cricket for Oxford University against Worcestershire at Oxford in 1967. The following year, he represented Ireland in a first-class match against the Marylebone Cricket Club in Dublin. He continued to play first-class cricket for Oxford University until 1970, making a total of 22 first-class appearances for the university. He scored a total of 944 runs in his matches for Oxford, at an average of 24.20, with a highest score of 79. One of eight first-class half centuries he made, this score came against Leicestershire in 1968. He later played minor counties cricket for Berkshire from 1972–1973. Outside of cricket, Ridley worked as a schoolteacher, eventually becoming headmaster of Denstone College, and later the Royal Belfast Academical Institution.
