= Michael Ridley (writer) =

English author, archaeologist, and orientalist

Michael Ridley is an English author, archaeologist, and orientalist.

In 1955 he was present at the opening of the Han tomb at Lei Cheng Uk in China. He has written many books and has spent time as curator at the Rochdale Museum in Lancashire, the Museum of Archaeology at Bournemouth, and served as director of the Tutankhamun Exhibition in Dorchester; as of 2008, he was keeper of Oriental Art and Archaeology at the Russell-Cotes Museum in Bournemouth. He is a Fellow of the Royal Asiatic Society, the Royal Anthropological Institute, and the Society of Antiquaries of Scotland.

== Works ==
- The Art of World Religions — Buddhism, Blandford Press, Dorset, 1978, ISBN 0-7137-0886-7
- Oriental Antiques in Color, Arco Publishing, 1978
- Style, Motif and Design in Chinese Art, Blandford Press, 1977
- Treasures from China, The Dolphin Press, 1973
- The Megalithic Art of the Maltese Islands, The Dolphin Press, Christchurch, 1972
- Far Eastern Antiquities, Gifford, London, 1972
- Oriental Art of India, Nepal and Tibet for Pleasure and Investment, Gifford, London, 1970
