= Royal Asiatic Society of Great Britain and Ireland =

British-Irish learned society specializing in Asia

The Royal Asiatic Society of Great Britain and Ireland
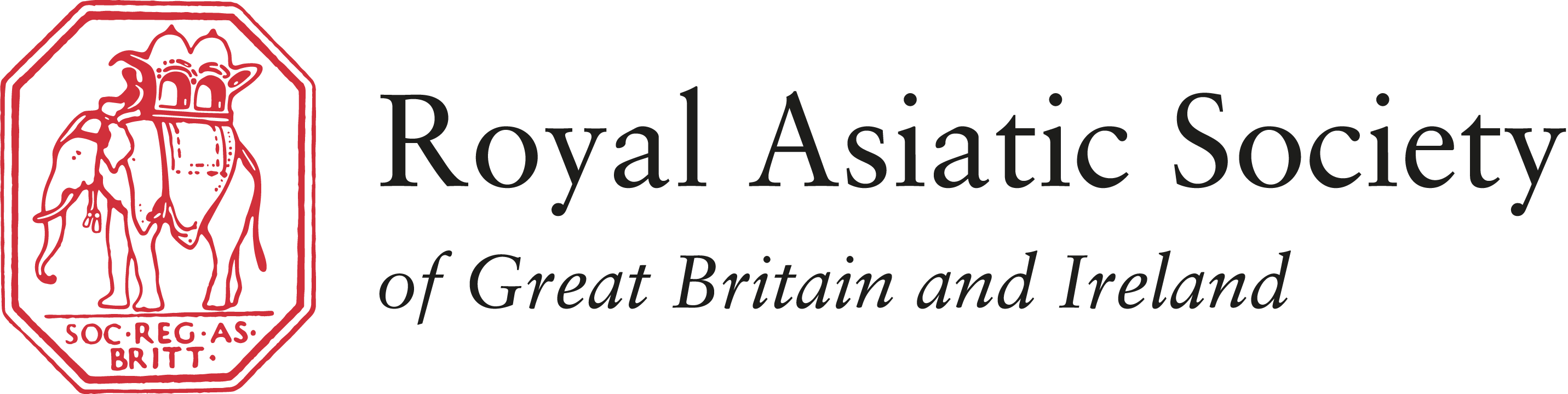
- Formation: 15 March 1823; 203 years ago
- Founder: Henry Thomas Colebrooke
- Type: UK registered charity
- Headquarters: 14 Stephenson Way, London, NW1 2HD, England, United Kingdom
- Location: Worldwide
- Patron: King Charles III
- President: Norbert Peabody
- Website: royalasiaticsociety.org

The Royal Asiatic Society of Great Britain and Ireland, commonly known as the Royal Asiatic Society, was established, according to its royal charter of 11 August 1824, to further "the investigation of subjects connected with and for the encouragement of science, literature and the arts in relation to Asia." From its incorporation the society has been a forum, through lectures, its journal, and other publications, for scholarship relating to Asian culture and society of the highest level. It is the United Kingdom's senior learned society in the field of Asian studies. Fellows of the society are elected regularly and include highly accomplished and notable scholars of Asian studies; they may choose to use the post-nominal letters FRAS.

== History ==
The society was founded in London in 1823, with the first general meeting being held on 15 March at the Thatched House on St James's Street, London, chaired by Henry Thomas Colebrooke. This meeting elected the officers (including Charles Williams-Wynn as the first president) and council, defined that the name of the society was the Asiatic Society of Great Britain and Ireland, and that members should be designated Members of the Asiatic Society (MAS). It also empowered the council to frame regulations (these were approved at the next general meeting on 19 April), to look for a suitable site for the society's meetings, and to seek a charter of incorporation. Later that year, at a general meeting held on 7 June, Williams-Wynn announced that King George IV, who had already agreed to be patron of the society, had granted the title of "Royal" to the society, giving it the name of the Royal Asiatic Society of Great Britain and Ireland and its members the designation Members of the Royal Asiatic Society (MRAS). The society received its charter under that name on 11 August 1824.

The Royal Asiatic Society was established by a group primarily composed of notable scholars and colonial administrators. It was intended to be the British counterpart to the Asiatic Society of Calcutta, which had been founded in 1784 by the noted Sanskrit scholar and jurist Sir William Jones. A leading figure in the foundation of the Royal Asiatic Society was Henry Thomas Colebrooke, who was himself an important Sanskrit scholar, and one time president of the Asiatic Society of Calcutta. Another was Sir George Staunton, 2nd Baronet, a Chinese-speaking diplomat who had worked in China.

Due to the nature of the society's close connection with the British Empire in the east, much of the work originating with the society has been focused on topics concerning the Indian subcontinent. However, the purview of the society extends far beyond India: all of Asia and into Islamic North Africa, and Ethiopia are included. The Society does have a few limitations on its field on interest, such as recent political history and current affairs. This particular moratorium led to the founding of the Central Asian Society, which later became the Royal Society for Asian Affairs. After World War II, with the gradual end of British political hegemony 'east of Suez', the society has maintained a politically neutral, academic focus on Asia.

Lectures are regularly held at the offices of the society. There is no charge for regular lectures. Many past lectures are available to listen to or watch online.

== Members and fellows ==
Originally, members of the Society were styled Members (MRAS), Honorary Members (Hon. MRAS), Corresponding Members (CMRAS) and Foreign Members (FMRAS). By the 1870s, the post-nominal letters FRAS, indicating fellowship of the society, were being used by some members, including the physician and writer on India John Forbes Watson, and the writer on India and co-founder of the India Reform Society John Dickinson. This usage continued through the twentieth century, advertisements in the society's Journal also reflecting the use of the letters FRAS by some members, although all members of the Society were referred to as "members" in the 1908 constitution, and it was not until 1967 that reports of the Anniversary Meeting referred to "fellows" rather than "members". As of 2019, members are designated "fellows" or "student fellows"; no post-nominals are assigned by the society to these grades in its regulations, but the use of the post-nominal letters FRAS is recognised in numerous reference works. The post-nominal letters are used by some academics working in Asia-related fields, and have been used in the society's Journal in reference to the Indologist Michael D. Willis, to the poet and translator of Bengali William Radice and to the Islamic scholar Leonard Lewisohn.

Notable members and fellows of the Society have included Rabindranath Tagore, Suhwang Cho, Sir Aurel Stein, Sir Wilfred Thesiger, Rai Bahadur Priya Lal Ganguly, and George V. Tsereteli.

== Branches ==
The society is affiliated with societies in India (Kolkata, Mumbai, Bengaluru, Chennai and Bihar).

It is also affiliated with the Royal Asiatic Society of Sri Lanka, the Royal Asiatic Society Hong Kong (established in 1847), the Asiatic Society of Japan (established in 1875), the Malaysian Branch of the Royal Asiatic Society (established in 1877), Royal Asiatic Society Korea Branch (established in 1900) and the Asiatic Society of Bangladesh (established in 1952 as Asiatic Society of Pakistan, and since 1972 renamed as Asiatic Society of Bangladesh).

In China, the former South China Branch is now known as the Royal Asiatic Society Hong Kong. The North China branch has been re-established in 2006 in Shanghai as the Royal Asiatic Society China, the original branch having been founded in 1857 and dissolved in 1952. It has chapters in Suzhou and Beijing.

== Library and archives ==
The library has material from the 12th century to the present. All Society collections can be accessed in its dedicated Reading Room in the society's offices in London during advertised opening hours. The society also maintains a digital library.

== Journal ==
The Journal of the Royal Asiatic Society is published by Cambridge University Press four times a year, each issue containing a number of scholarly essays, and several book reviews. It has been published under its current name since 1991, having previously been the Journal of the Royal Asiatic Society of Great Britain and Ireland (1834–1991) and Transactions of the Royal Asiatic Society of Great Britain and Ireland (1824–1834). The present editor of the Journal is Daud Ali of the University of Pennsylvania. The Journal is double-peer-refereed.

== Oriental Translation Fund of Great Britain and Ireland ==
This fund was initially established in 1828. The results of its initial funding projects were soon forthcoming. The fund became one of a large number of Victorian subscription printing clubs which published translations, re-issued historical works or commissioned original books which were too specialized for commercial publication; but unlike most of those now defunct organizations, the work of the Royal Asiatic Society Oriental Translation Fund is on-going into the 21st century with a "new series" and "old series" microform catalog available for scholarly research.

== Royal Asiatic Society prizes and awards ==
For full details and recipients, see the Royal Asiatic Society's website.

- Research Fellowships: Michael Willis and Peter Flügel.
- The Surya P. Subedi Prize - an annual prize awarded for a publication on Nepal.
- The Charles H. Norchi Prize - an annual prize awarded for a book on Afghanistan.
- The Professor Mary Boyce Prize - for religion in Asia.
- The David Morgan Memorial Prize - for an article published in the Journal of the Royal Asiatic Society during a calendar year. For recent PhD recipients.
- The Royal Asiatic Society's New Barwis-Holliday Award - awarded for new unpublished research on any of: anthropology, art, history, literature or religion of any part of East Asia.
- The Royal Asiatic Society Award - awarded every three years; for Asian Studies (this award replaced the Royal Asiatic Society Gold Medal).
- The Sir Richard Burton Medal - awarded to scholars and travellers within Asia.
- The Denis Sinor Medal - for Inner Asian studies.
- The James J. Busuttil Medal and Prize - an annual silver medal and prize awarded for a book on human rights.

== President ==
Currently (2024–), the president of the society is Norbert Peabody and the vice-president is Sarah Ansari.

== Past presidents ==
- 2021–2024 Sarah Ansari
- 2018–2021 Anthony Stockwell (3rd term)
- 2015-2018 Gordon Johnson (2nd term)
- 2012–2015 Peter Robb
- 2009–2012 Gordon Johnson
- 2006–2009 Anthony Stockwell (2nd term)
- 2003–2006 Francis Robinson (2nd term)
- 2000–2003 Anthony Stockwell
- 1997–2000 Francis Robinson
- 1993–1997 David W. MacDowall
- 1990–1993 Adrian David Hugh Bivar
- 1988–1990 Frank Steele
- 1979–1988 Sir Cyril Philips
- 1976–1979 Charles Fraser Beckingham (2nd term)
- 1973–1976 E.H.S. Simmonds
- 1970–1973 Basil William Robinson
- 1967–1970 Charles Fraser Beckingham
- 1964–1967 Sir Harold Walter Bailey
- 1961–1964 Sir Richard Olaf Winstedt (4th term)
- 1958–1961 Gerard L.M. Clauson
- 1955–1958 Sir Richard Olaf Winstedt (3rd term)
- 1952–1955 Sir Ralph Lilley Turner
- 1949–1952 Sir Richard Olaf Winstedt (2nd term)
- 1946–1949 Roger Lumley, 11th Earl of Scarbrough
- 1943–1946 Sir Richard Olaf Winstedt
- 1940–1943 Herbert Samuel, 1st Viscount Samuel
- 1939–1940 Freeman Freeman-Thomas, 1st Marquess of Willingdon
- 1937–1939 Malcolm Hailey, 1st Baron Hailey
- 1934–1937 David Samuel Margoliouth
- 1931–1934 Edward Douglas Maclagan (2nd term)
- 1928–1931 Lawrence Dundas, 2nd Marquess of Zetland
- 1925–1928 Edward Douglas Maclagan
- 1922–1925 Robert Chalmers, 1st Baron Chalmers
- 1921–1922 Richard Carnac Temple
- 1893–1921 Donald James Mackay, 11th Lord Reay
- 1890–1893 Thomas George Baring
- 1887–1890 Thomas Francis Wade
- 1884–1887 William Muir
- 1882–1884 Sir Henry Bartle Frere (2nd term)
- 1881 Sir Thomas Edward Colebrooke (3rd term)
- 1878–1881 Henry Creswicke Rawlinson (2nd term)
- 1875–1878 Sir Thomas Edward Colebrooke (2nd term)
- 1872–1875 Sir Henry Bartle Edward Frere
- 1869–1871 Henry Creswicke Rawlinson
- 1867–1869 Percy Smythe, 8th Viscount Strangford (2nd term)
- 1864–1867 Sir Thomas Edward Colebrooke
- 1861–1864 Percy Smythe, 8th Viscount Strangford
- 1858 William Henry Sykes
- 1855–1858 Horace Hayman Wilson
- 1852–1855 William Baring, 2nd Baron Ashburton
- 1849–1852 Francis Egerton, 1st Earl of Ellesmere
- 1843–1849 George Eden, 1st Earl of Auckland
- 1842–1843 William Vesey-FitzGerald, 2nd Baron FitzGerald and Vesey (died in office)
- 1841–1842 George FitzClarence, 1st Earl of Munster (died in office)
- 1823–1841 Charles Williams-Wynn

== See also ==
- Fellows of The Royal Asiatic Society of Great Britain and Ireland
- Journal of the Malaysian Branch of the Royal Asiatic Society
- Royal Asiatic Society of Sri Lanka
- Royal Asiatic Society Korea Branch
- Royal Asiatic Society Hong Kong Branch
- Royal Asiatic Society China
