= Sergi Jikia =

Georgian orientalist

- სერგი ჯიქია
- Born: October 20, 1898; Onoghia, Martvili Municipality
- Died: December 6, 1993 (aged 95)
- Citizenship: Russian Empire → Democratic Republic of Georgia → USSR
- Education: Tbilisi State University; Istanbul University
- Alma mater: Tbilisi State University
- Awards: Order of the Red Banner of Labour; Order of Lenin
- Scientific career
- Fields: Turkology
- Institutions: Tbilisi State University

Sergi Jikia (Georgian: სერგი ჯიქია; October 20, 1898 ― December 6, 1993) was a Georgian historian and orientalist, founder of the Turkology in Georgia.

== Biography ==
Sergi jikia was born in the village of Onoghia (Georgian: ონოღია; now Martvili Municipality). In 1906 he enrolled at the parish school of Onoghia. In 1913 he continued his study at the Tbilisi Theological School, where he admitted in the third class. After completing the four classes of the school, he went to the Theological Seminary (from 1917 Tiflis 8th Gymnasium for Boys), which he graduated from in 1919.

Upon finishing the gymnasium with honours, he enrolled at the faculty of philosophy of Tiflis State University, first at the department of history and a year later at the department of linguistics. In 1923 he was elected a member of the Georgian society of linguistics. In 1924 he graduated from Tiflis State University.

From 1927 to 1929 Sergi Jikia was sent to the Istanbul University to learn the Turkish language and literature. He worked on the Turkish language and historical sources in the archives in Istanbul. In 1929-1932 he was a postgraduate student at the Nikolai Marr Institute of the Academy of Sciences of the USSR. In 1930-1936 Sergi Jikia worked as an assistant professor at the Leningrad University, where he was awarded with the honorary title. From 1934 to 1936 he was a senior research fellow at the N. Marr Institute.

From 1936 to 1945 Sergi Jikia was a head of the department of oriental languages at Tbilisi State University. In 1936-1960 he worked at the institute of linguistics of the Georgian Academy of Sciences. From 1945 to 1952 he was a dean of the faculty of oriental studies at Tbilisi State University. In 1945-1973 he was a head of the department of Turkish university in Tbilisi.

In 1959, Sergi Jikia was invited by the Polish Academy of Sciences and the University of Warsaw to Poland with academician Giorgi Tsereteli to give lectures. From 1960 until his death, he was a head of the department of turkology at the Institute of Oriental Studies at the Academy of Sciences of the Georgian SSR.

== Contributions ==
Sergi Jikia has worked on Turkish philology, dialectology of Turkish languages, Turkish language history, Turkish historical sources, Turkish-Georgian relations, and Eastern Anatolian and Azerbaijani dialects of Turkish. He studied Georgian, Megrelian and Laz texts in Evliya Çelebi's Seyahatnâme. He published Defter-i Mufassal-i Vilayet-i Georgia, dated 1595, with the original text, Georgian translation, analysis and explanations as The Great Book of the Tbilisi Vilayet. He also studied Laz-Turkish relations. Jikia prepared Georgian-Turkish dictionaries Azerbaijan compiling Georgian textbooks for schools in Turkey. Jikia is the author of Turkish reading passages published in Georgia and Saint Petersburg.

== Awards and honours ==
Sergi Jikia was awarded the medal for valiant labour in the great patriotic war 1941-1945 and the degree of a candidate of philological sciences in 1946. In 1956 he received the degree of a doctor of philological sciences and next year he became a professor. In 1961, Sergi Jikia was awarded the title of an honored person of the Georgian SSR. He was awarded a medal for labor bravery in 1961.

== Legacy ==
A street in Tbilisi is named after Sergi Jikia. The book "Founder of Georgian Turkology: Sergi Jikia" about the life of Sergi Jikia was written by Ia Duduchava and translated into Turkish by Ilyas Ustunyer.

== Works ==
- Sergi Jikia, Nodar Shengelia; "The Great Book of the Tbilisi Vilayet of 1728".

== Bibliography ==
- Jangidze V., Georgian Soviet Encyclopedia, Vol. 11, Tbilisi, 1987. - p. 568.
