= John Dickinson (writer) =

English writer on India

John Dickinson (1815–1876) was an English writer on India.

== Early life ==
The son of the papermaker John Dickinson of Nash Mills, Abbots Langley, Hertfordshire, he was born on 28 December 1815 and educated at Eton College. He declined to take part in his father's business.

Dickinson travelled in Europe and began to write on behalf of liberal causes.

== India Reform Society ==
Taking up Indian reform, Dickinson had support from his uncle, General Thomas Dickinson, of the Bombay Engineers, and his cousin, Sebastian Stewart Dickinson. A public works commission was appointed by Lord Dalhousie in 1852 to inquire into the deficiencies of administration pointed out by Dickinson and his friends. On 12 March 1853, a meeting was held in Dickinson's rooms, and a society was formed under the name of the India Reform Society.

Initially involved, besides Dickinson, were two Members of Parliament, John Blackett and Henry Danby Seymour. John Bright came onto the committee, and his contacts gave the Society access to many more MPs; his interests included Indian cotton as an alternative source to the United States, and lobbying the British government to have Indian infrastructure improved. Another activist was Francis Carnac Brown who had been a committee member of the earlier British India Society, formed in 1839 by Joseph Pease (1772–1846).

The debate in parliament of 1853 on the renewal of the East India Company's charter gave the society a short-term objective, and the maintenance of good faith towards the Indian states a major theme. The Indian Rebellion of 1857 made for another push, in efforts towards moderation, and to prevent exclusive attention to penal and repressive measures, and Dickinson organised a series of public meetings.

After 1859 the India Reform Society began to languish: at a meeting in 1861 Bright resigned the chairmanship, and carried by a motion appointing Dickinson his successor. The publication in 1864–5 of two pamphlets entitled Dhar not restored roused in Calcutta feeling against Dickinson, who was called a "needy adventurer". By 1865 the Society had ceased to function.

== Life ==
On the death of his father in 1869, Dickinson inherited a fortune, but was in weak health. He corresponded with Tukojirao Holkar II, maharajah of Indore. On 23 November 1876 he was found dead in his study, at 1 Upper Grosvenor Street, London.

== Works ==
Dickinson wrote:

- Letters on the Cotton and Roads of Western India (1851) based on a series of letters appeared in The Times in 1850 and 1851
- India, its Government under Bureaucracy, London, 1852. It was reprinted in 1853 as one of a series of "India Reform Tracts".
- The Famine in the North-West Provinces of India, London, 1861.
- Reply to the Indigo Planters' pamphlet entitled "Brahmins and Pariahs", published by the Indigo manufacturers of Bengal, London, 1861.
- A Letter to Lord Stanley on the Policy of the Secretary of State for India, London, 1863.
- Dhar not restored, 1864.
- Sequel to "Dhar not restored", and a Proposal to extend the Principle of Restoration, London, 1865.
- A Scheme for the Establishment of Efficient Militia Reserves, London, 1871.
- Last Counsels of an Unknown Counsellor, edited by Evans Bell, London, 1877; another edition 1883. A reply to Holkar's critics.

== Notes ==
Attribution

This article incorporates text from a publication now in the public domain: Stephen, Leslie, ed. (1888). "Dickinson, John". Dictionary of National Biography. Vol. 15. London: Smith, Elder & Co.
