= Anthony Stockwell =

British academic

Professor Anthony John "Tony" Stockwell, FRAS is a British academic. He is best known for his research into the history of British imperialism and decolonisation in Southeast Asia.

Professor Stockwell was appointed President of the Royal Asiatic Society from 2018-2021, having previously served in that capacity from 2000-2003 and 2006-2009. In 1989, he became joint editor of the Journal of Imperial and Commonwealth History. In 2002, he became Chairman of the Friends of The National Archives.

Stockwell was appointed to the History Department at Royal Holloway, University of London (RHUL) in 1972. In 1996, he was promoted to Professor of Imperial and Commonwealth History. He has served as the college's Dean of Overseas Students, Dean of the Faculties of Arts and Music, and Head of the History Department.

Stockwell was educated at Whitgift School in London and St John's College, Cambridge. After periods of school teaching, including Voluntary Service Overseas in Sarawak, Malaysia, and as an assistant principal in the home civil service, he did a doctorate in Malaysian history at the University of London's School of Oriental and African Studies before pursuing an academic career.

== Selected publications ==
- A. J. Stockwell (January 2005). The Making of Malaysia: Britain, the 'Grand Design', Decolonisation and Malaysia. I. B. Tauris. ISBN 978-1-85043-845-8.
- 'Forging Malaysia and Singapore: Colonialism, Decolonization and Nation-Building', in Wang Gungwu, ed., Nation-Building: Five Southeast Asian Histories (Singapore, 2005), 191-219.
- ed., Malaysia (British Documents on End of Empire series, The Stationery Office, London, 2004)
- 'Malaysia: the making of a Grand Design', Asian Affairs, 24, 3 (2003), 138-156
- 'Britain and Brunei, 1945-1963: imperial retreat and royal ascendancy', Modern Asian Studies, 38, 4 (2004), 785-820
- (with Peter Burroughs) ed., Managing the Business of Empire: Essays in Honour of David Fieldhouse (London, 1998)
- ed., British Documents on the End of Empire: Malaya (3 parts, London, 1995)
- (with A.N. Porter), British Imperial Policy and Decolonization, 1938-1964 (2 vols, London, 1987 & 1989)
- (with R.B. Smith) ed., British Policy and the Transfer of Power in Asia: Documentary Perspectives (London, 1987)
- (with J. de V. Allen and L.R. Wright) ed., A Collection of Treaties and Other Documents affecting the States of Malaysia 1761-1963 (2 vols, London, 1981)
- British Policy and Malay Politics during the Malayan Union Experiment, 1942-1948 (Kuala Lumpur, 1979)
