= Gayageum =

Traditional Korean string instrument

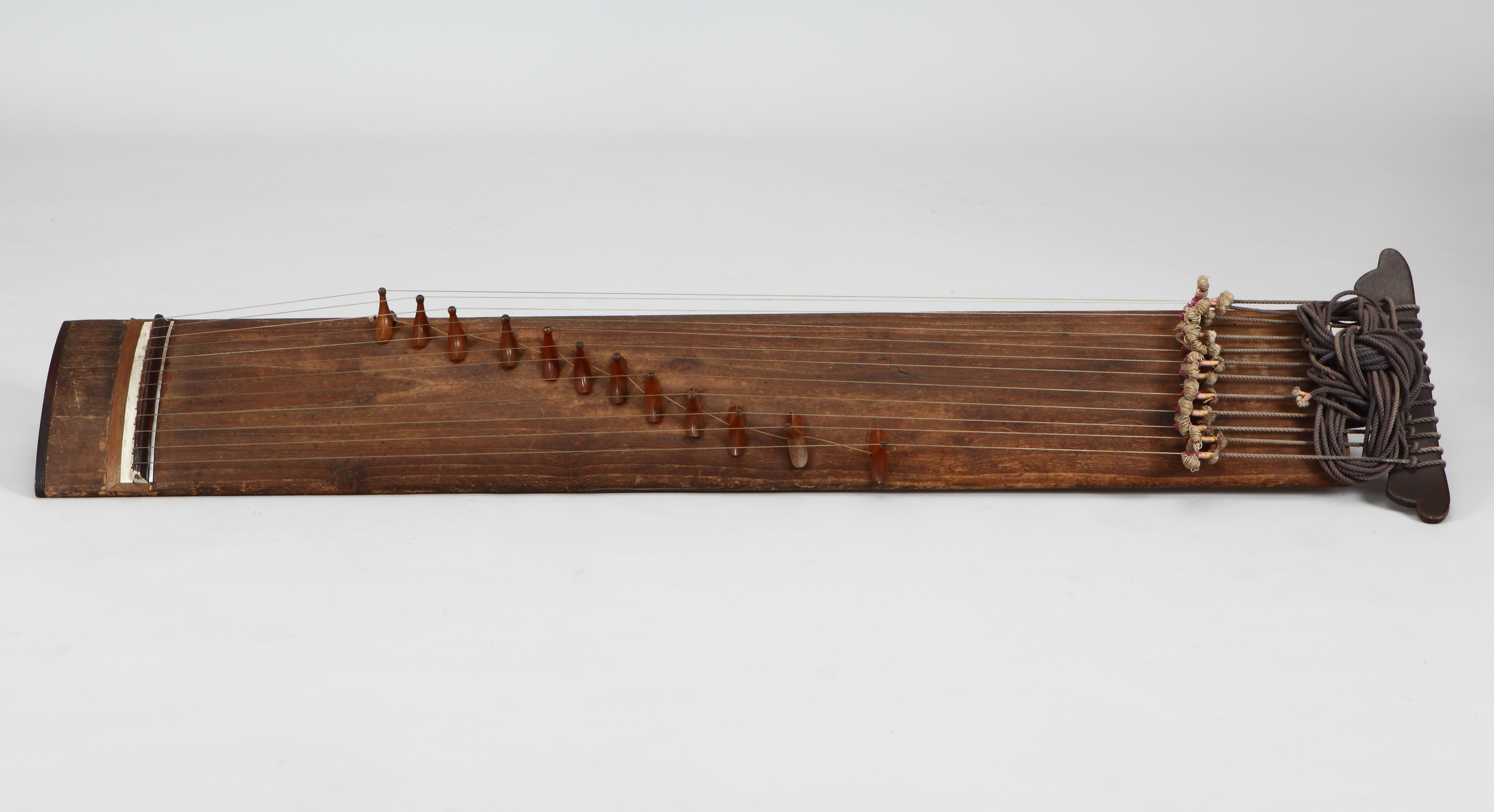

Korean name
- Hangul: 가야금
- Hanja: 伽倻琴
- RR: gayageum
- MR: kayagŭm

Demonstration of the sound of gayageum by a non-professional player

The gayageum or kayagum (Korean: 가야금; Hanja: 伽倻琴) is a stringed musical instrument classified as a type of a plucked zither and used in traditional Korean music.

The instrument traditionally has 12 strings, though some more recent variants have 18, 21 or 25 strings. It is probably the best known traditional Korean musical instrument. The gayageum is based on the Chinese guzheng and is similar to the Japanese koto, Mongolian yatga, Vietnamese đàn tranh, Sundanese kacapi and Kazakh jetigen.

== History ==
=== Pungryu gayageum (beopgeum, jeongak gayageum) ===
According to the Samguk sagi (1146), a history of the Three Kingdoms of Korea, the gayageum was developed around the sixth century in the Gaya confederacy by King Gasil (also known as Haji of Daegaya) after he observed an old Chinese instrument Guzheng. He ordered a musician named Wu Ruk to compose music that could be played on the instrument. The original name was gayago(or gayatgo) and later gayageum. The gayageum was then further improved by Wu Ruk during the reign of Jinheung in the Silla dynasty. The ancient gayageum of King Gasil was called by several names, including beopgeum (law-zither, 법금), pungryu (elegance, 풍류), or jeong-ak (right music, 정악) gayageum. It is normally associated with accompaniment for court music, chamber music, and lyric songs. This type of gayageum has a wider spacing between the strings and plays slower-tempo music such as Yeongsan hoesang and Mit-doduri.

=== Sanjo gayageum ===
The sanjo gayageum is believed to have evolved in the 19th century with the emergence of sanjo music, which in Korean literally means "scattered melodies", a musical form that involves fast tempos and some improvisation. The sanjo gayageum version of the instrument has closer string spacing and a shorter length to let musicians play the faster passages required for sanjo. The sanjo gayageum is now the most widespread form of gayageum. All traditional gayageum use silk strings, though since the late 20th century, some musicians use nylon.

=== Modern gayageum ===
Modern versions of the gayageum with more strings often use nylon-wrapped steel strings, similar to those used for the Chinese guzheng. Brass strings have also been introduced to produce a louder sound, which is preferred for accompanying dance. To play modern music, gayageum with a greater number of strings have been developed, increasing the instrument's range. Gayageum are available with 13, 17, 18, 21, 22, or 25 strings, though instruments with more strings are available custom-made. The 21-string gayageum is normally found in North Korea.

Types of gayageum

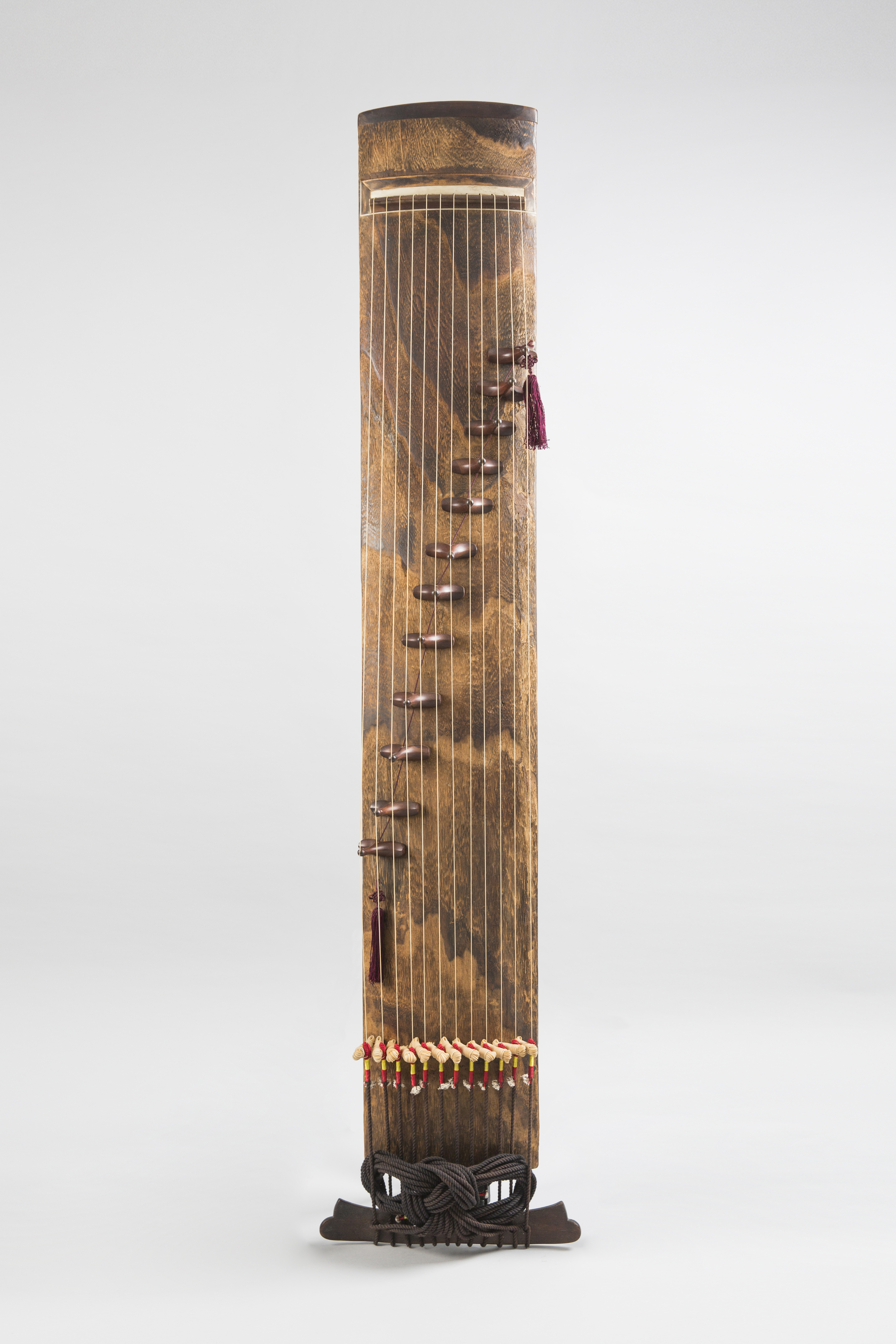
Pungnyu gayageum

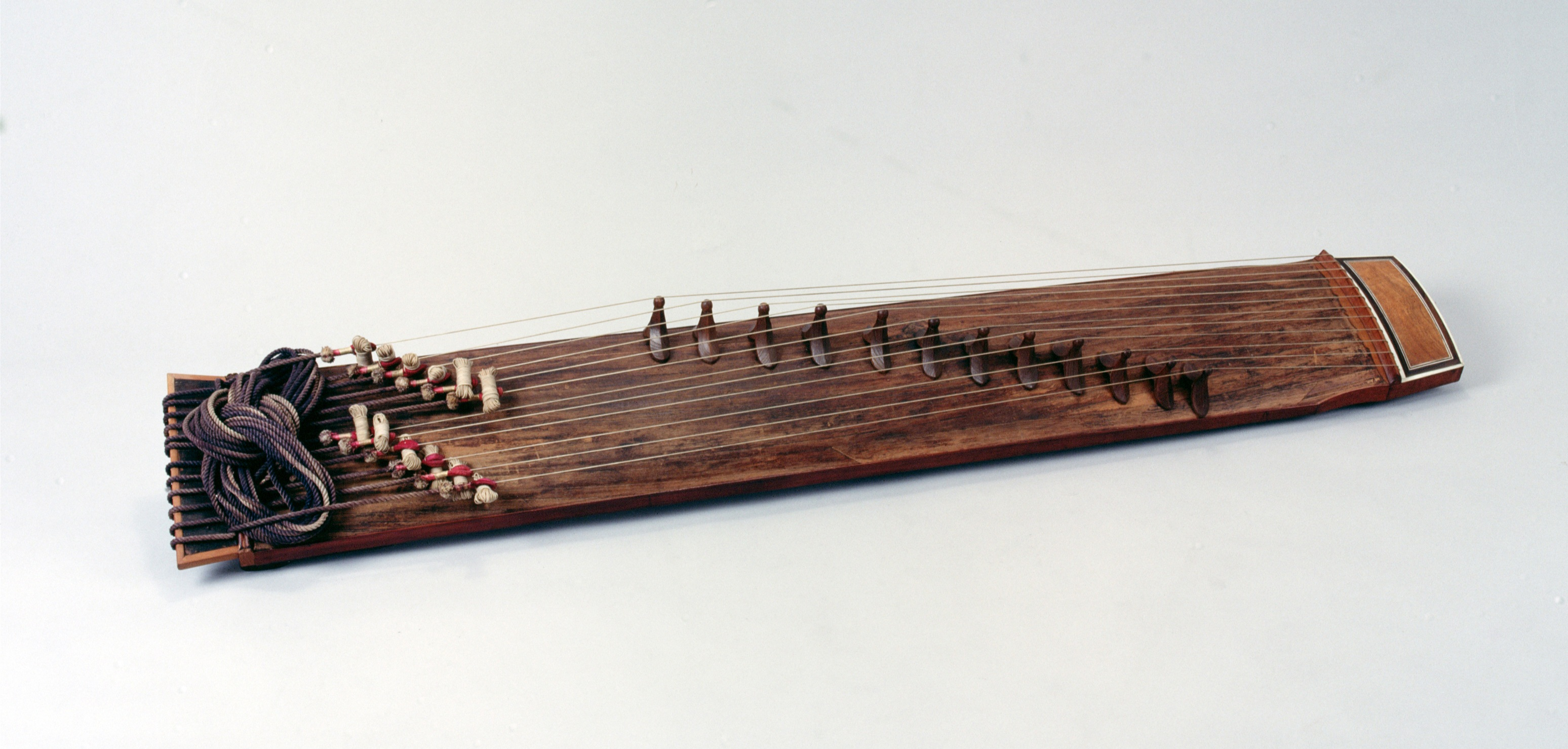
Sanjo gayageum

Improved gayageum

== Playing method ==
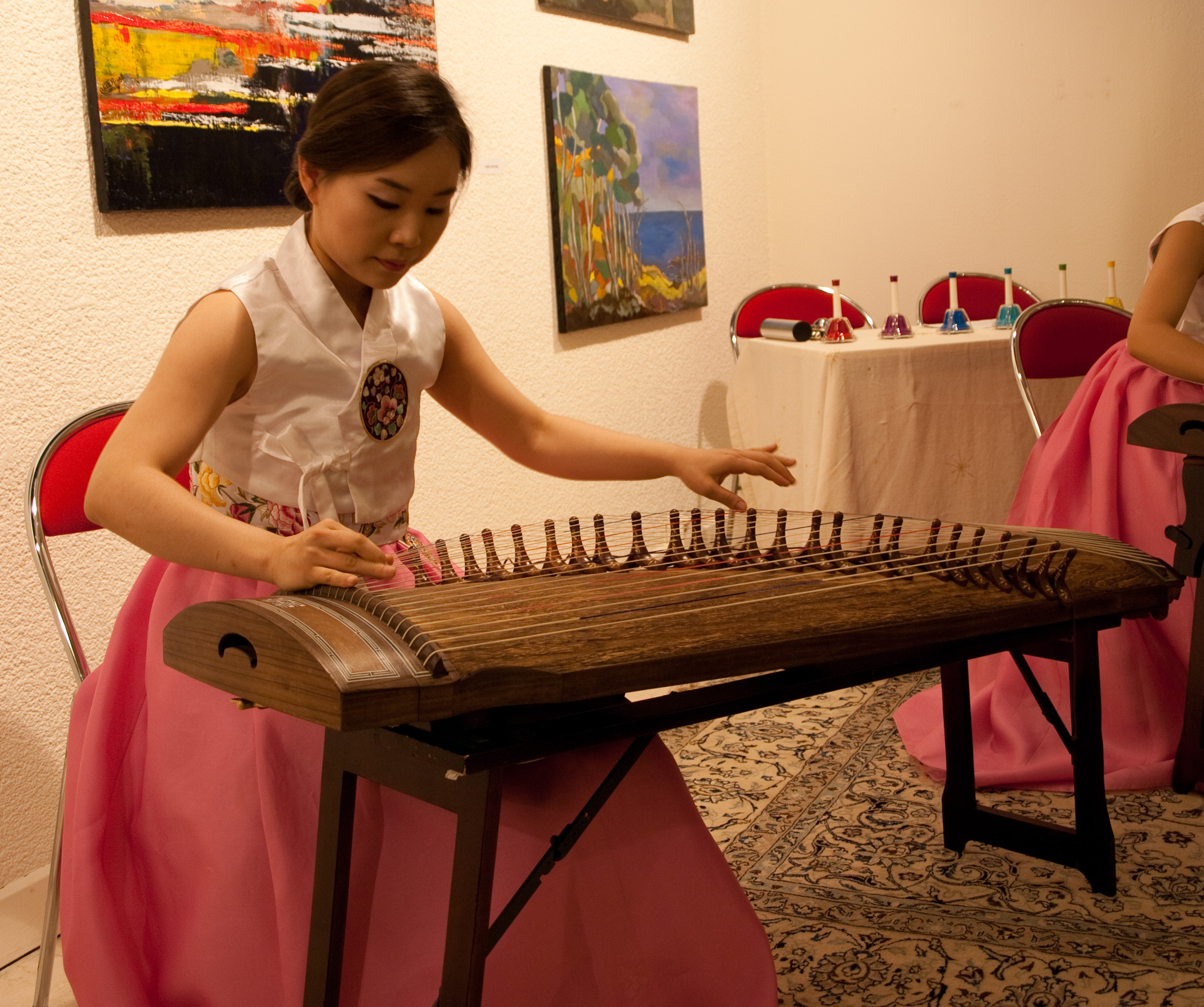
Concert Kwak SooEun and ensemble playing the gayageum

The gayageum is traditionally played when sitting on the floor with crossed legs, the head of the instrument resting on the right knee and the tail resting on the floor. When played whilst seated on a chair or stool, the tail end is usually placed on a special fold-out stand, similar to a camp-stool, or another chair/stool. For modern gayageum, they may be placed on a special stand with the player seated on a chair behind the instrument. The people of North Korea usually play whilst seated on a chair, but they do not use a stand of the tail end. Instead, the gayageum has detachable legs that are fixed into the end to raise the tail high enough.

The gayageum is played with both right and left hands. The right hand plucks and flicks the strings close to the bridge of the gayageum, whilst the left hand pushes the strings on the left side of the bridges to raise the pitch and adds vibrato and other ornamentation.

=== Techniques and notation ===
==== Right Hand Fingering Notation and Techniques ====
These notations are placed above the staff in contemporary sheet music. If not explicitly stated, the strings are typically struck using the index finger.

symbol	action	further information
1	Strike with thumb	
2	Strike with index finger	
3	Strike with middle finger	
2-1	Strike two separate strings with first the index then thumb in a grabbing motion	The strings played are typically one string apart, and the index strikes the lower string
3-1	Strike two separate strings with first the middle finger then thumb in a grabbing motion	The two strings plucked are typically an octave, with the lower note being struck with the middle finger. This technique is referred to as ssaraeng (싸랭), and its purpose is to add emphasis/grace notes
○	Flick with index finger	
8	flick with middle finger	
8-○	flick with the middle finger, followed by a flick with the index on the same string	This technique is typically used in Hwimori Jangdan (휘모리 장단) for fast passages. It is referred to as ssangtwinggim (쌍튕김; lit. 'double bounce').

== Tunings and modes ==
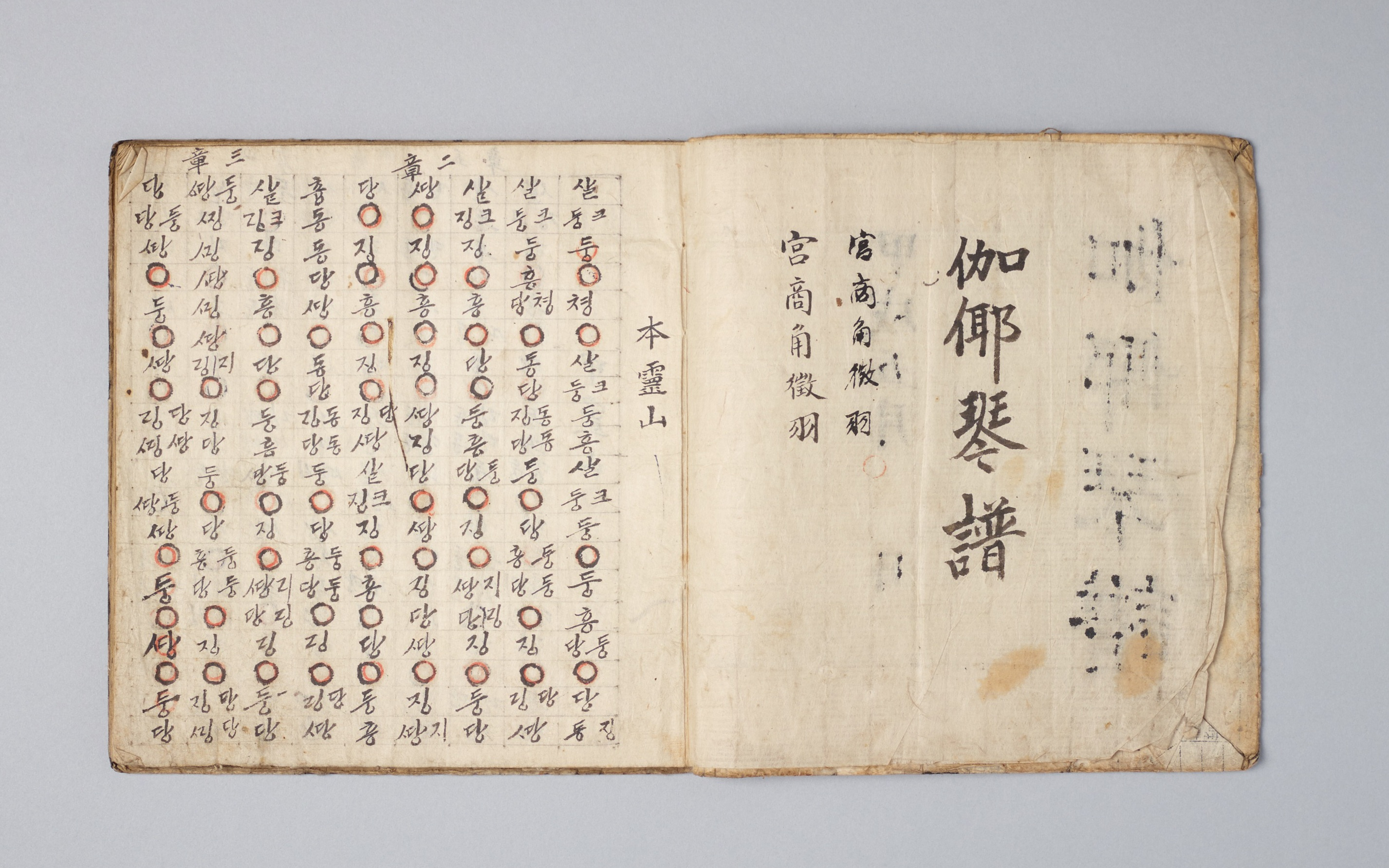
Gayageum sheet music (manuscript)

The gayageum can be tuned to a variety of pitches depending on use, though no standard exists as to what exact pitches they should be tuned. They include:

- E♭, F, A♭, B♭, E♭, F, A♭, B♭, c, e♭, f, a♭
- E♭, F, A♭, B♭, E♭, E♭, A♭, B♭, d♭, e♭, f, a♭
- E♭, A♭, B♭, E♭, F, A♭, B♭, c, e♭, f, a♭, b♭
- G, C, D, G, A, C, D, E, G, A, c, d

When noted in staff notation, however, the pitch series is usually transposed as the following, regardless of the actual pitches tuned on the strings:

- D, G, A, D, E, G, A, B, d, e, g, a

This is to avoid switching between the bass and treble clefs to make reading the music easier.

Traditionally, three modes are used:

- 羽調 (우조): G key
- 平調 (평조): C key
- 界面調 (계면조): B♭ key

== Construction ==
The beobgeum gayageum is 160 cm long by 30 cm wide by 10 cm deep. Its body is made of a single piece of paulownia wood. The resonator chamber is hollowed out of the piece of paulownia.

The sanjo gayageum is about 142 cm long by 23 cm wide by 10 cm deep. The soundboard is made of paulownia, but the sides and back are of a harder wood such as chestnut or walnut.

On the soundboard, anjok (movable bridges) support the strings. These bridges move to adjust the tuning and intonation. The strings enter the top of the body from tolgwae (string pegs) beneath. At the other end, the strings wind around loops at the end of thick cords, which pass over the nut then looped through holes at the bottom of the instrument and secured, and then the cords are all tied in a decorative coil.

The left hand presses the strings to raise the pitch, and finger movements perform various movements such as shaking, bending, and vibrating the strings. The right hand plucks or strums the strings. The gayageum's tone is soft, delicate, and subtle. Legend says the instrument was first made by King Gasil in the Kaya Kingdom around the sixth century, and was further developed by a musician named Ureuk (우륵; 于勒) in the time of King of Jinhung in the Silla dynasty.

According to some evidence, however, it dates to a much earlier time than the Silla dynasty. Recent archaeological excavations in the Kwangsan areas in Jeolla-namdo Province revealed fragments of a gayageum from around the first century BCE.

The gayageum is employed in different types of music, leading to variations of the instrument, including the following:

- Pungryu gayageum is the original form, with more widely spaced strings for slower-tempo works.
- Sanjo gayageum is a smaller, modern version with more closely spaced strings to accommodate rapid playing.
- Modern gayageum instruments broaden the body and add more strings to increase the pitch range to accommodate contemporary music.

== Music ==
=== Jeongak ===
Yŏngsanhŏesang (영산회상), Ch'ŏnnyŏnmanse (천년만세), Gagok (가곡). Pohŏsa (보허사), Yŏmillak.

=== Sanjo and folk ===
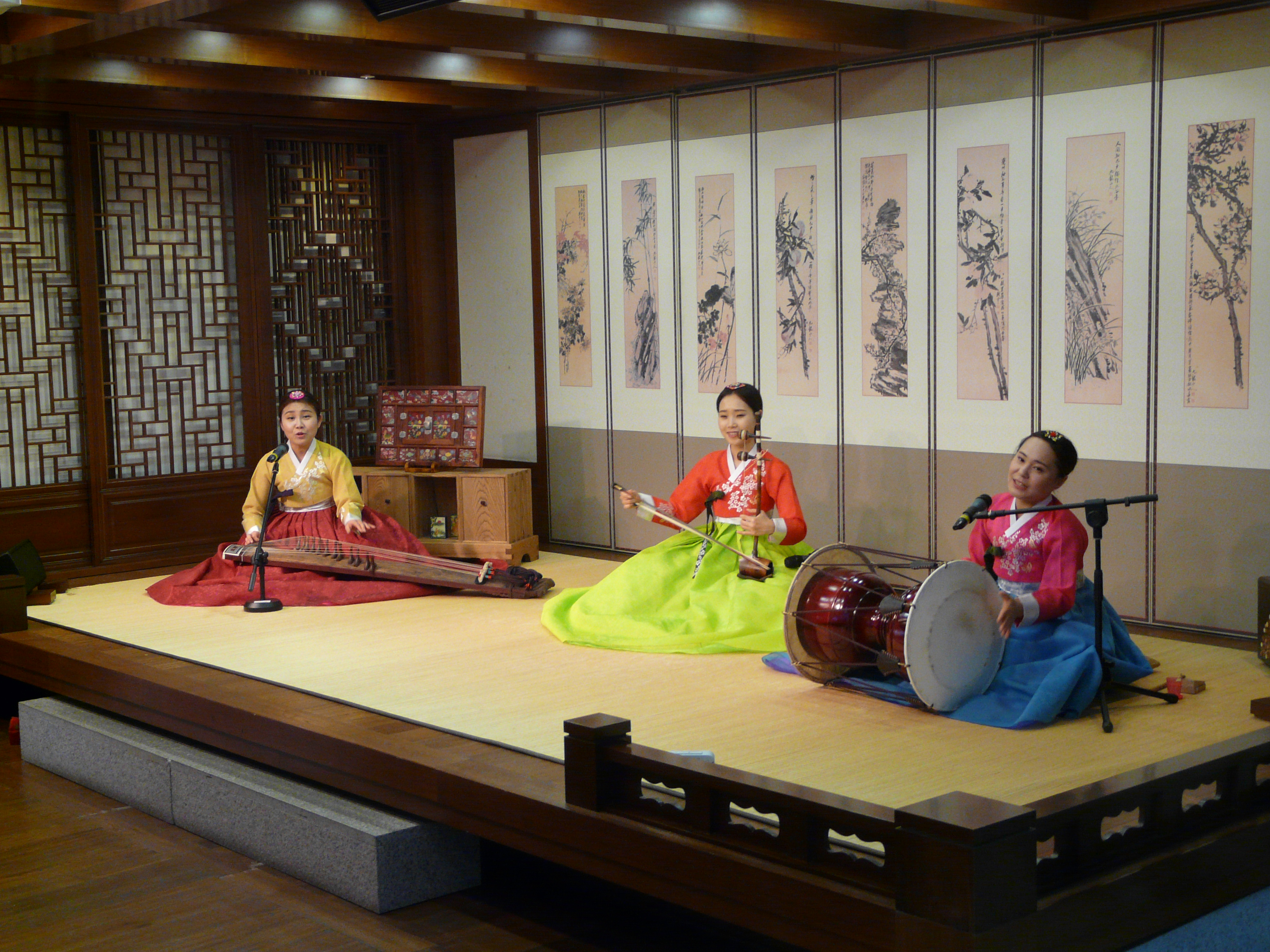
In Incheon Airport

The six or more schools of the gayageum sanjo include Seong Geum Yeon, Kim Juk Pa, Kim Yoon Deok, Kang Tae Hong, Kim Byeong Ho, and Choi Ok Sam schools.

=== Contemporary ===
Contemporary music composers have been creating modern music for the gayageum. Hwang Byung Ki composed "Forest" as a first modern gayageum piece, Sungcheon Lee created 21-string gayageum and new pieces. Beomhoon Park composed the gayageum concerto "New Sanjo" (새산조) for 25-string gayageum, and following generation's composers and western musicians have been composing modern music for it.

== See also ==
- List of musical instruments
- Traditional Korean musical instruments
- Korean music
- Korean culture
- Geomungo
- Santur
- Kacapi
- Ajaeng
