= Conception dreams =

Dreams said to foretell childbirth

In Korean culture, conception dreams (Korean: 태몽; Hanja: 胎夢; RR: taemong; MR: t'aemong) is dreams that are said to foretell the conception or birth of a child, dreamt by the future mother or people close to her.

Many Korean women report having such dreams themselves. Popular topics of the dreams include fruit (such apples, persimmons, cherries, chestnuts), animals (tigers, snakes, goldfish), nature (rivers, rainbows), children and jewels. The dreamer might eat or take fruits, embrace animals, or interact with nature. The topic is believed to influence the gender or the future of the baby; for example, fruits are seen as a sign for a baby girl.

The person having the dream can be the mother herself, but close family members such as her mother or the husband can also have conception dreams instead of the mother. Dreams are often considered to be omens, and sometimes people will "buy" dreams from friends, if they feel it is a good omen or a good conception dream.

Accounts of conception dreams can be found in numerous old histories. One example is the conception dream of Kim Yushin, from the 6th century AD, documented in the Samguk Sagi.

== In popular culture ==
- Reply 1988 series: Season 1 episode 7

== See also ==
- Taegyo
- Pregnancy
- Prenatal development
- Korean mythology
