= Banjjogi =

Korean folk tale

Banjjogi is a Korean folk tale that tells the story of the eponymous protagonist who is born with only half a body, but goes on to overcome his disability, using his strength and cunning to defeat a tiger and a greedy man, marry the greedy man’s daughter, and prosper. Various names for the protagonist include banjjogi, oejjogi and oejjagi.

== History and Transmission ==
This tale is not found in documentary records of stories pre-dating Korea’s late-19th-century Enlightenment Period. Today, the earliest known woodblock-printed edition of the story is Banjjok saram (반쪽 사람 The Half Person), which appears in Sim Ui-rin’s 1926 work Joseon donghwa daejip (조선동화대집 Grand Collection of Korean Children’s Stories). The first versions to clearly indicate dates and places of recording are those found in Im Seok-jae’s Hanguk gujeon seolhwa (한국구전설화 Orally Transmitted Tales from Korea), collected in Pyeongsangbuk-do and Gyeonggi provinces between 1927 and 1934. Approximately 16 versions have been collected and reported in the form of orally transmitted stories gathered through field studies, including those in Hanguk gubi munhak daegye [한국구비문학대계 Outlines of Korean Oral Literature] and historical records of local districts.

== Plot ==
=== Basic plot ===
A husband and wife were trying hard to conceive a child. One day, a monk came and the wife made a donation to him. The monk gave her three cucumbers, saying that if she ate them she would have three sons. She ate two of the cucumbers, then shared the third one with her husband. The wife later gave birth to three children, but the youngest was born with only half a body. Their father, who was a hunter, was killed by a tiger while hunting. At this, the three boys went out to hunt the tiger and avenge their father, despite their mother’s protests. Banjjogi tried to go with his older brothers, but they tied him to a tree and left him behind.

Banjjogi pulled up the tree to which he was tied, took it home, and told his mother that his brothers had told him to do so. Next time, his brothers tied him to a rock. But Banjjogi carried the rock home, too. Eventually, all three brothers went off hunting together. When they reached the beginning of the gorge where the tiger lived, they stopped for the night at the home of an old woman known as Patjuk. Patjuk told them that the tiger caught and ate hunters by transforming into a woman. She also told the boys how they could catch the tiger. Banjjogi did as she had instructed, catching the tiger, recovering his father’s remains and bringing them back along with the tiger’s skin. Then, the old woman told him that his mother was going to be eaten by a tiger, so he packed his belongs and set off again. He caught the tiger and saved his mother’s life.

Meanwhile, the tiger skin caught the eye of the rich man who lived down the road. He made a bet with Banjjogi: If Banjjogi could make off with the rich man’s daughter, the rich man would let him marry her. If he failed, he would have to give the rich man the tiger skin. The rich man then rounded up all the villagers and made them guard his house. But Banjjogi stole his way into the rich man’s house, hung the man guarding the house to the doorframe by his topknot, painted sulfur on the rich man’s beard, and put a drumstick in the man’s wife’s hand. Then he put the man’s daughter on his back and set off again, shouting. Everyone was taken by surprise and chaos ensued. The rich man’s beard caught fire. Banjjogi married the rich man’s daughter and went on to prosper.

=== Variations ===
The key elements of Banjjogi are the protagonist’s extraordinary birth, the bullying he suffers from his brothers, the extermination of tigers, his bet with the rich man, and his marriage. Some versions of the story omit birth-related motifs or tiger extermination. In some cases, Banjjogi kills tigers by way of a bet; in others, his main achievement is not killing tigers but saving his brothers. Some versions of the story end with Banjjogi becoming a rich man by hunting tigers, while others end with him getting married. The food eaten by Banjjogi’s mother in order to conceive her children varies from version to version, with examples including daikon radishes, cucumbers, fish, peaches and nuts.

== Features and Significance ==
The core element in the tale of Banjjogi is the strange birth of its protagonist with the physical characteristic of having only half a body. And the way he eliminates obstacles through his own strength and cunning, in spite of his physical limitations and the unkindness and scorn of those around him makes Banjjogi a typical folktale character. Meanwhile, his extraordinary birth and superhuman abilities are both transcendental, extraordinary qualities that allow Banjjogi to be understood as a mythical character. Some interpret Banjjogi’s incomplete body as a caricature of the abilities of a divine being, making it a modification of the motif of his extraordinary birth.

The tale of Banjjogi generally proceeds through four narrative stages. First, Banjjogi’s mother eats food that makes her conceive him, then gives birth to him. In the second stage, Banjjogi is bullied by his brothers because of his physical deficiencies. In stage three, he uses his own strength to overcome his brothers’ scorn, hunt the tiger, and prospers. In the fourth and final stage, Banjjogi wins the bet about making off with the rich man’s daughter, and marries her. Various versions show differences in narrative composition. Some include illustrations of formidable archery skills, similar to elements found in Kkul gangaji (꿀 강아지 Honey Dog), Agi jangsu seolhwa (아기장수설화 The Tale of the Young General), and the stories of Jumong and King Yuri. Frequent story modification is thus among the narrative characteristics of the tale of Banjjogi, making it culturally significant for the insights it offers into the formation process of folktales.

== Other ==
Stories of characters with only half a body are found across the world in places including North America, northeastern Siberia, Africa, Indonesia and Arab regions. China’s Shan hai jing (山海經 Classic of Mountains and Seas) contains a record of people who walk around on a crooked knee and bent foot, having only one arm and one leg, while India’s Mahabharata, too, contains the story of prince Jarasandha, about two queens in the kingdom of Magadha who shared a mango and then both gave birth to half-sons.

Banjjogi has become established as a leading children’s book, with several dozen versions published in formats including storybooks, picture books and fairy tales. It featured prominently in textbooks as part of Korea’s seventh national curriculum, under the title Horangi-reul jabeun Banjjogi (호랑이를 잡은 반쪽이 Banjjogi, Who Caught the Tiger). It has also been made into children’s plays such as Banjjogi jeon (반쪽이전 The Tale of Banjjogi) and Nae chingu banjjogi (내친구 반쪽이 My Friend Banjjogi), and musicals.
