= Taegyo =

Traditional Korean practices surrounding prenatal care

- Hangul: 태교
- Hanja: 胎敎
- RR: taegyo
- MR: t'aegyo

Taegyo (Korean: 태교) refers to a traditional Korean concept that encompasses practices and beliefs related to prenatal development. Part of traditional Korean medicine, it dictates what actions a mother should take in order to have a healthy child.

== History ==
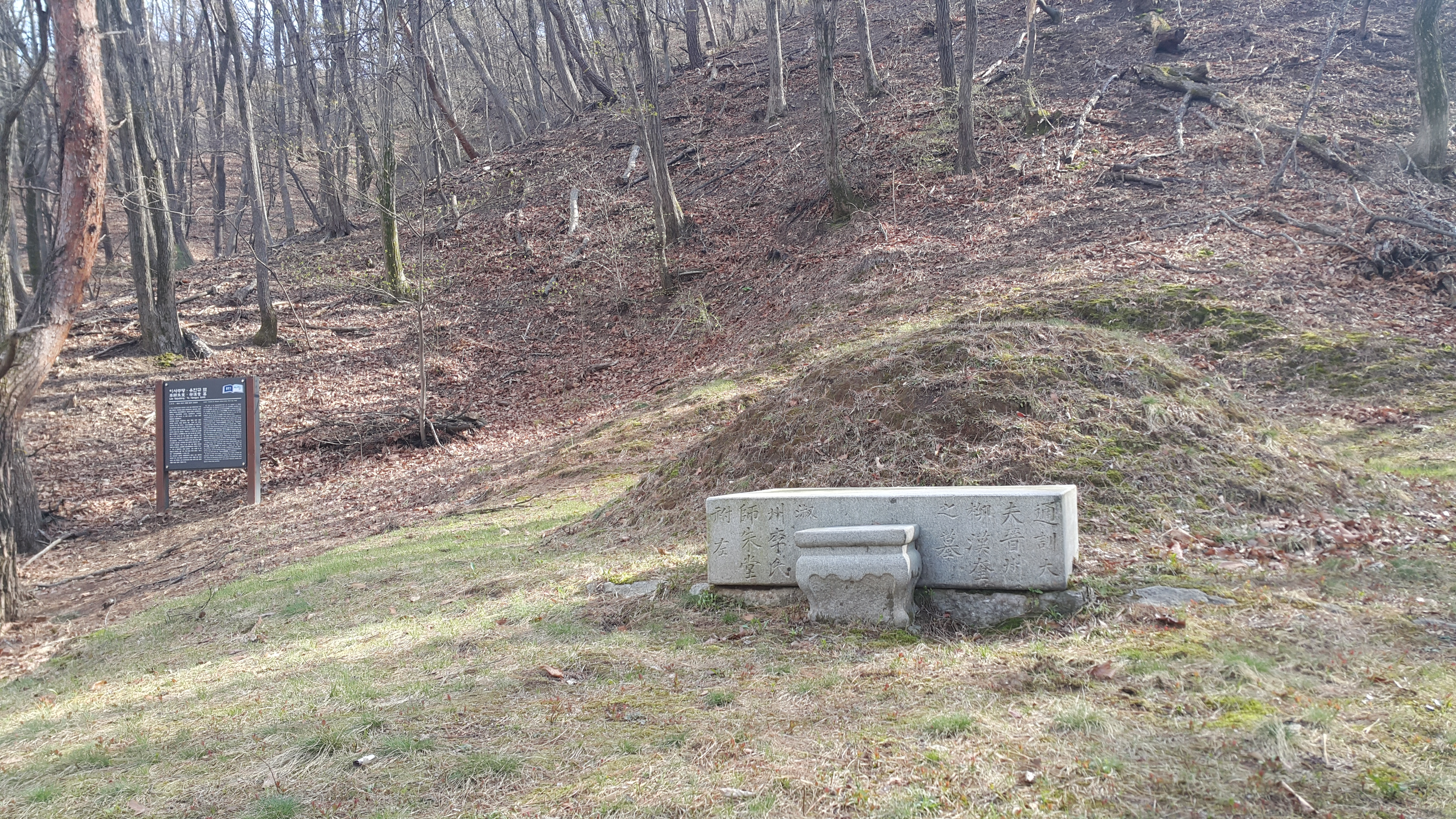
Grave of Lee Sajudang

Taegyo was introduced into Korea from China at the end of the 918–1392 Goryeo period. During the 1392–1910 Joseon period, it grew in popularity. In 1800, the Korean female scholar Yi Sajudang (사주당 이씨; 師朱堂李氏) wrote a book on the subject entitled Taegyosingi (태교신기; 胎敎新記). In her book, Yi asserted that, for a child, the ten months of education it receives in the mother's womb is more important than the ten years of education that follows it. Proponents of taegyo claim that its ideas overlap with, but originated significantly earlier in time than the child development theories of the Western world.

Taegyo's popularity in Korea has continued into modern times: almost every book for pregnant women in Korea includes a Taegyo section. It is common for modern Korean women to practice Taegyo during pregnancy.

== Concepts ==
In Taegyo, the embryo is considered to be a person from fertilization. Proponents of Taegyo believe the Oriental way of determining a person's age (which adds 10 months onto the age counted from the day they were born) supports this theory. According to Taegyo theory, as an embryo and fetus, this newly created person is strongly influenced by its emotional environment: the mindset of the pregnant woman. Taegyo is a set of practices claimed to create the best environment for fetal development.

Practicing Taegyo is largely the responsibility of the woman. Various rule sets have been promoted: the aim of all the rules is to prevent emotional turmoil in the pregnant woman. Proponents of Taegyo point to studies showing the detrimental health effects of stress as supporting their belief that an environment of emotional calm is vitally important to the healthy formation of a child. The most popular rule set is a traditional practice called the seven attitudes. An oral tradition for many years, the seven attitudes were first found in a published book in 1973, in a work by Lee Kyutae (이규태) in 1973.

While the rule sets focus on controlling the woman's behavior, Taegyo holds that the actions and attitude of the husband and father are equally important: the husband is believed to be the person with the greatest influence on the emotional state of his pregnant wife. Common recommendations for the husband are to abstain from smoking and drinking and to maintain a happy and devout mind.

Proponents of Taegyo believe that the emotional stability of a pregnant woman has a stronger effect on the health of the fetus than does the woman's physical health. One study they cite found that women with high levels of stress and anxiety during pregnancy had children at increased risk of attention deficit/hyperactivity, anxiety and language delay. Another study touted by proponents found that cortisol levels in ten-year-old children showed a relationship to their mother's anxiety level late in pregnancy.

While Taegyo places great importance on avoiding emotional turmoil in a pregnant woman, maintaining a calm mind is considered, in itself, not enough. Different types of Taegyo focus on producing a child with a specific quality. For example, English Taegyo is done with the wish to improve the fetus's language competence. Sound Taegyo, which involves listening to good music, is done to developing the emotional sensitivity and the connection between the mother and child.

== Practices ==
=== Talking ===
By nine weeks, a developing fetus can hiccup and react to loud noises. By the end of the second trimester it can hear. Among other mental feats, the fetus can distinguish between the voice of the mother and that of a stranger, and respond to a familiar story read to it. Taegyo holds that the best way to stimulate the developing brain of a fetus is to talk to it. The belief is that children who were talked to in the mother's womb are faster language learners, more social, more athletic, and more emotionally sensitive. Talking to the fetus is also believed to increase the strength of the mother-child bond.

According to Taegyo, at the time the fetus develops the ability to hear (during the fifth or sixth month of pregnancy), it also begins to feel the same emotions as the pregnant woman. Taegyo practice is to talk to the fetus with the intent of promoting and environment of affection, love, and happiness. Involvement of the woman's husband and other children in the family is believed to increase the beneficial effects on the fetus, as well as bringing the existing family closer together.

=== Reading stories ===
Reading children's stories to the fetus is held to aid hearing and emotional development. Reading stories with strong emotional themes, especially, is believed by Taegyo supporters to benefit the emotional development of the fetus. Reading stories is also encouraged because family members who feel awkward just talking to the fetus may be more comfortable reading aloud. In addition, Taegyo recommends having the couple or family discuss the stories after reading them.

=== Playing sounds ===
A recent study of premature infants found that they were soothed by music. Music can be used by pregnant women to help them maintain the state of emotional calm demanded by Taegyo. Proponents of Taegyo claim many other benefits of playing calming music for the fetus: stimulation of development of the right side of the brain, development of superior hearing ability, better clarity of thought, emotional stability, hormone secretion, blood pressure, and brain waves.

In addition to listening to music, Taegyo recommends that the pregnant woman and her husband sing or play instruments. This is believed to comfort the fetus and encourage healthy deep breathing in the woman.

Taegyo teaches that music originate in the sounds of nature, and exposing the fetus to natural sounds is also held to be important. Recommended sounds include bird song, insect chirps, sea waves, and similar.

=== Doing yoga ===
Yoga reduces stress and so can be very helpful to a woman trying to maintain the calm mind required by Taegyo. Yoga may also provide physical benefits to the pregnant woman, reducing the discomforts of pregnancy and easing childbirth and post-delivery recovery. Taegyo recommends beginning regular yoga practice in the fifth month of pregnancy, and especially recommends the cat and butterfly poses.

== See also ==
- Conception dreams
- Doljanchi
- Yoga
