= Korean birthday celebrations =

Common milestones celebrated by Koreans

Korean birthday celebrations are one of the important facets of Korean culture. When a person reaches an important age in his or her life, Koreans have unique celebrations to mark these milestones. Dol means it has been 365 days since the baby's birth.

== Dol (돌) ==
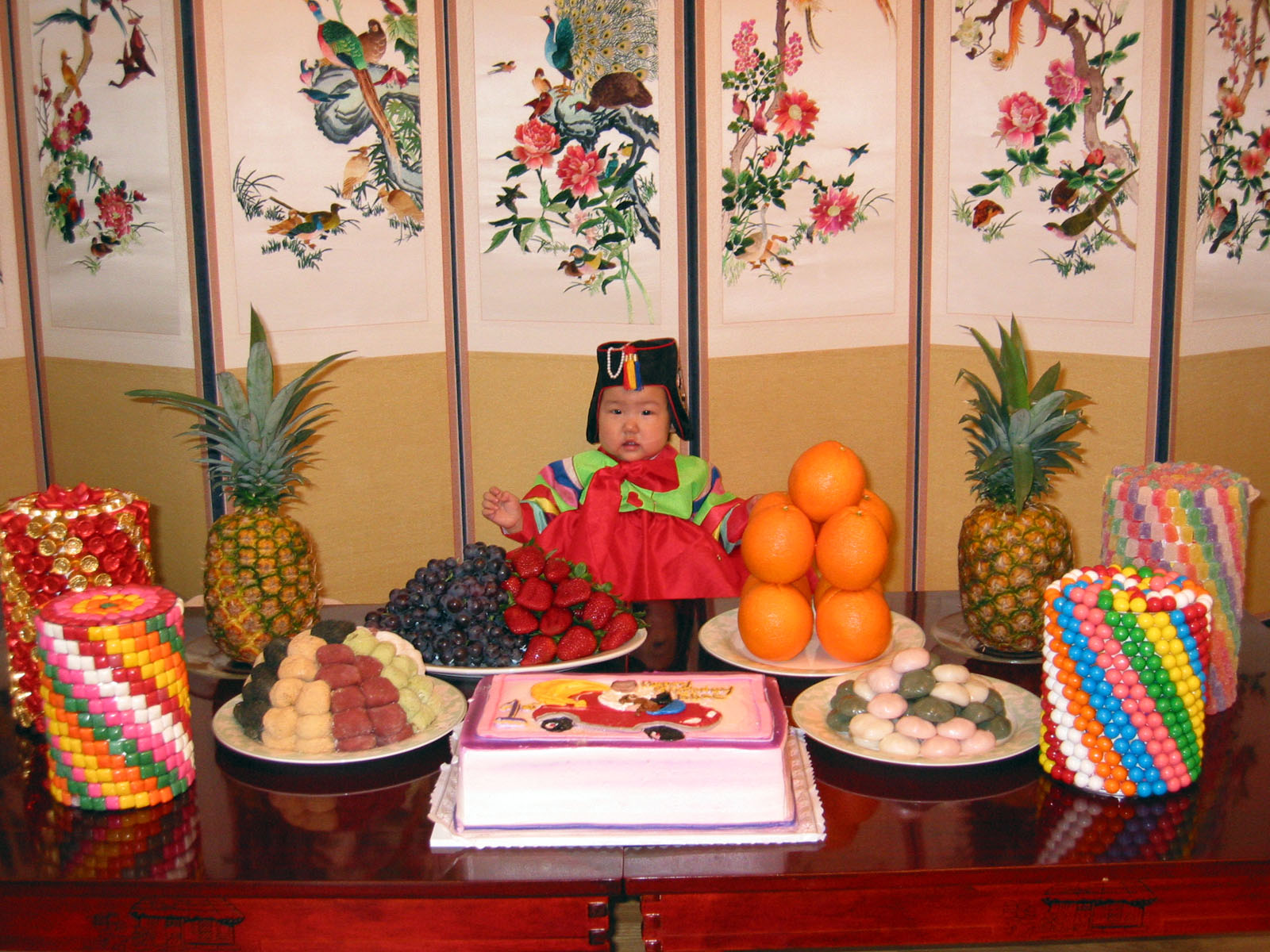
Dol ceremony

Dol (doljanchi, or tol) is probably one of the best-known of the Korean birthday celebrations. Dol is celebrated for the first year of a child.

The first part of the dol celebration is prayer. Traditionally, Koreans would pray to two of the many Korean gods: Sansin (the mountain god) and Samsin (the birth goddess). Koreans would prepare the praying table with specific foods: a bowl of steamed white rice, seaweed soup (miyeok-guk) and a bowl of pure water. Layered red bean rice cakes (samsin siru) were placed next to the prayer table. The rice cakes were not shared outside the family; it was believed that sharing this particular item with people outside the family would bring bad luck to the child. After everything on the praying table was ready the mother (or grandmother) of the child would pray to Sansin and Samsin, placing her hands together and rubbing her palms. She would ask for her child's longevity, wish luck to the mountain god, and give thanks to the birth goddess. After she finished her prayer, she bowed to Samsin several times. Women were the only ones allowed to participate in this ceremony; men were forbidden to be part of the praying. When the praying ceremony commenced depended on the region. People from Seoul would pray in the early morning of the child's birthday; other regions prayed the night before. Today this part of the celebrations is usually skipped, because Muism (the religion that worshiped the Korean gods) is rarely practiced.

Before the main part of the celebration, the baby is dressed in very colorful, ornate clothing called dol-bok. The dol-bok that the child wears differs according to the child's sex. A boy would traditionally wear a pink or striped jeogori (jacket) with purple or gray baji (pants), a striped durumagi (long jacket), a blue vest printed with a gold or silver pattern or a striped magoja (jacket), a jeonbok (long blue vest) with a gold or silver pattern, a bokgeon (black hat with long tail), and tarae-beoseon (traditional socks). A girl would wear a striped jeogori, a long red chima (skirt), a gold-and-silver printed jobawi (hat) and tarae-beoseon. In addition to their dol-bok, boys and girls would wear a long dol-tti (belt that wraps around the body twice) for longevity and a dol-jumeoni (pouch) for luck. The dol-jumeoni would be made of fine silk, with a thread to open and close it. Buttons were not used in the dol-bok, to symbolize longevity.

The doljabi is the main celebration of dol. A large table is prepared with over a dozen different types of rice cakes or tteok (the main food). Some types of tteok are baekseolgi (white steamed rice cakes), susu-gyeongdan (rice cakes coated with rough red bean powder), mujigae-tteok (rainbow-colored steamed rice cakes) and gyepi-tteok (puffed-air rice cakes). Along with the tteok, fruit is also served; the fruit on the table varies, depending on the season. There is also a bowl of rice and various other foods placed on the table. Food is not the only thing on the table, however; there is also a large spool of thread, a brush, a Korean calligraphy set, a pencil, a book, money (10,000-won bills) and a bow and arrow (or a needle, ruler and pair of scissors for girls). After the table is set, the parents sit the baby on a traditional Korean mattress (boryo) and Korean cushions (bangseok). This is done so that relatives can get better pictures of the infant. There is also a traditional screen in the background. The doljabi then begins. The baby picks up various items on the table that attracts him or her. The items that the child picks up are said to predict the child's future. If the child picks up the thread, the child will have a long life. A child who picks up the pencil, book or calligraphy set is forecast to be a good scholar. A child who picks the rice, rice cakes, or money will become rich; some say that choosing the rice (or a rice cake) means the child is unintelligent, or that they will never be hungry. If the ruler, pair of scissors or needle is chosen, it is said that the child will be dexterous. If the child chooses the knife, they will become a good chef. In the modern era, people often prepare modern objects such as an airplane, ice skates, a microphone, a stethoscope or a computer mouse, to symbolize current successful occupations. In the past, families would use items they had in their household but in modern times, people purchase either a modern or traditional Doljabi set from Korean stores that specialize in Korean traditions.

== Seire (세이레) ==
The baby's well-being is celebrated 21 days after the birth with a meal of white rice, Miyeok guk (Miyeok seaweed soup), and Baekseolgi (white rice cake tteok). The Baekseolgi symbolizes sacredness. By this time, the baby and mother are still recovering from birth, so people were not allowed to see them. However, close family members are met and prayed for the healthy recovery of the baby's mother on this day.

== Baek Il (백일) ==
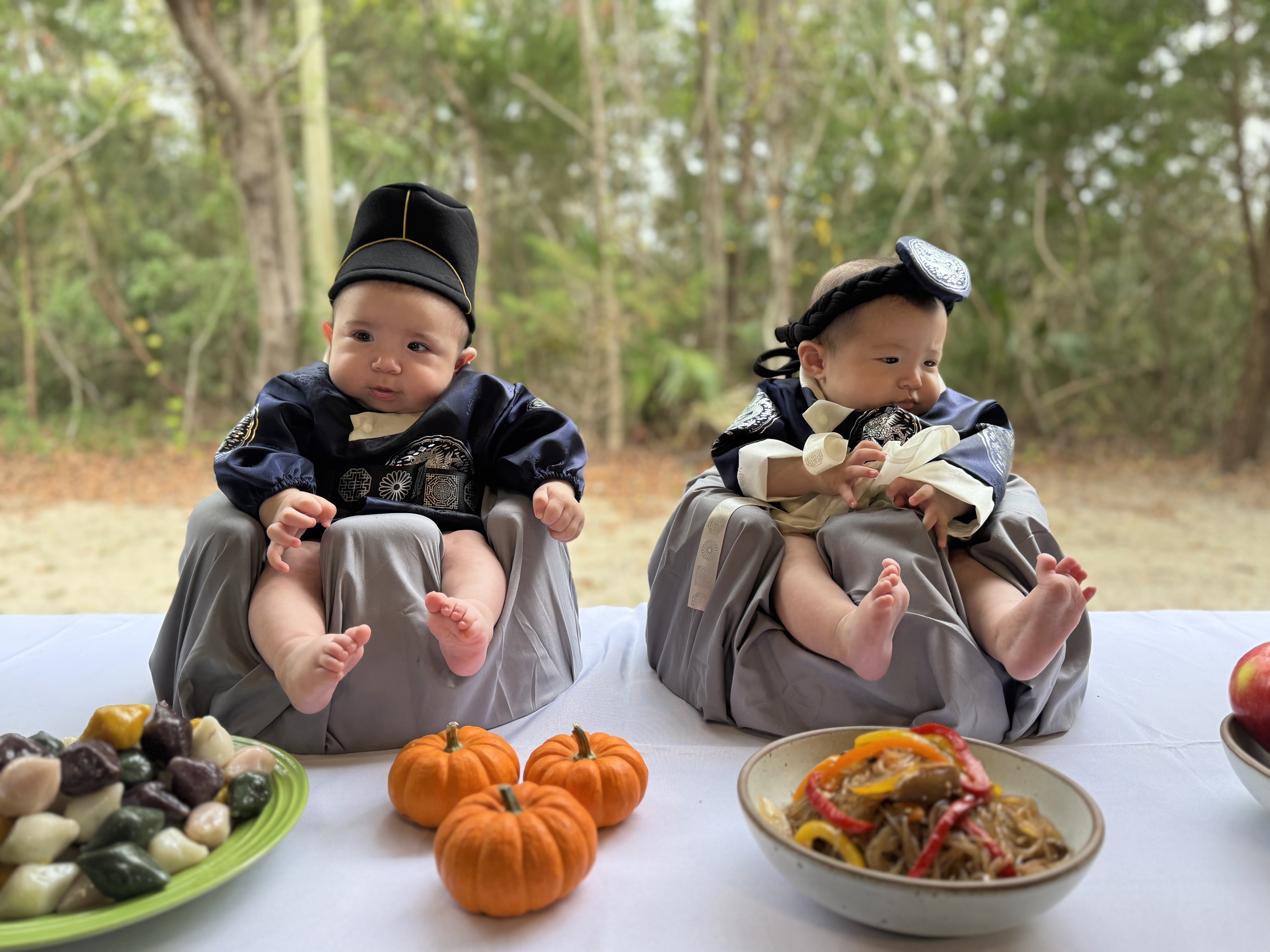
Korean-American twins celebrate their Baek Il (100 days) in modern hanboks

Another birthday celebration is baegil (100th-day celebration). The 100th day celebration originates from a time in pre-modern Korea when infant mortality was high and families waited until a child's 100th day of life to celebrate their birth. Making it past the 100th day of life was an indicator that a child would live until at least their first birthday. Modern celebrations are a time to congratulate the parents and family on the birth of their child. Typically celebrations include special food items, especially rice cakes, and are an opportunity for numerous family photos to be taken with the infant.

During this celebration, the family worships Samsin. They make her offerings of rice and soup for having cared for the infant and the mother, and for having helped them live through a difficult period. They give thanks to Samsin and also pray for jae-ak (wealth), longevity, and chobok (traditional word for "luck"). After the prayer the family, relatives and friends celebrate with rice cakes, wine, and other delicacies such as red and black bean cakes sweetened with sugar or honey. In order to protect the child, red bean rice cakes are placed at the four compass points of the house. This not only brought protection, but was also believed to bring good fortune and happiness. It is widely believed that if 100 people share the rice cakes the child will live a long life, so the family would also send rice cakes to neighbors and others. Those who receive rice cakes return the dishes with lengths of thread (expressing the hope for longevity), rice and money (symbolizing future wealth).

== Hwangap (환갑) ==
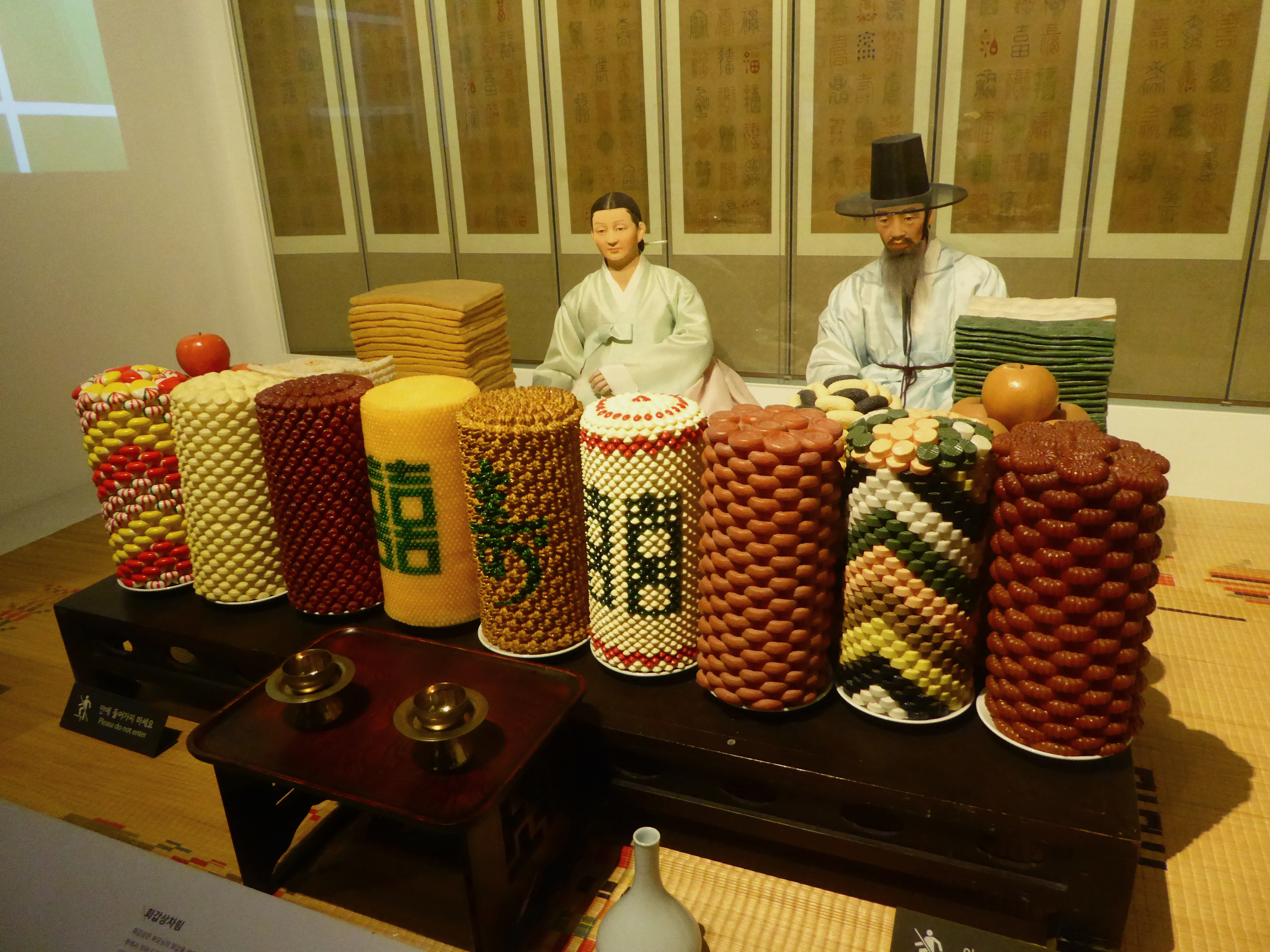
Diorama of a Sixtieth Birthday Party in the National Folk Museum of Korea

When a person turns 60, there was a celebration known as hwangap. This was considered an auspicious year, since when someone turned 60 the cycle of the Korean zodiac is complete. Each person is born under one of the twelve zodiac animals. It takes 60 years for the zodiac animal and the element under which one is born to align. Another reason that hwangap is so important is that many years ago (before the advent of modern medicine), it was uncommon for a person to live 60 years. There is a celebration; children honor their parents with a feast and merrymaking. Part of the celebration involves the children of the birthday celebrant; starting with the eldest, they bow and offer wine to their parents. After the children give their respects to their parents, their children show respect to them; again starting with the eldest, in the same way. While these rituals are being carried out, traditional music is played and professional entertainers sing songs, encouraging people to drink. In order to make the recipient of the hwangap feel young, adults and teens dress in children's clothing. They also sing children's songs and dance children's dances.

== Coming-of-age rites ==
A less well-known birthday celebration is when a boy or girl reaches adult age (20 for the boy and 15 for the girl). When a boy turned into an adult he would tie his hair into a top knot and be given a gat (traditional cylindrical Korean hat made of horsehair). He would be required to lift a heavy rock as a test of his strength. If he can lift and move the rock, he is considered a man. A girl would become an adult when she married and showed her non-single status by rolling her braided hair into a chignon bun and fixing it with a binyeo, a long ornamental hairpin.

== See also ==
- Doljanchi
- East Asian age reckoning § Korea
- Twelve Auspicious Rites, a similar series of milestones for Burmese children
