= Culture of Korea =

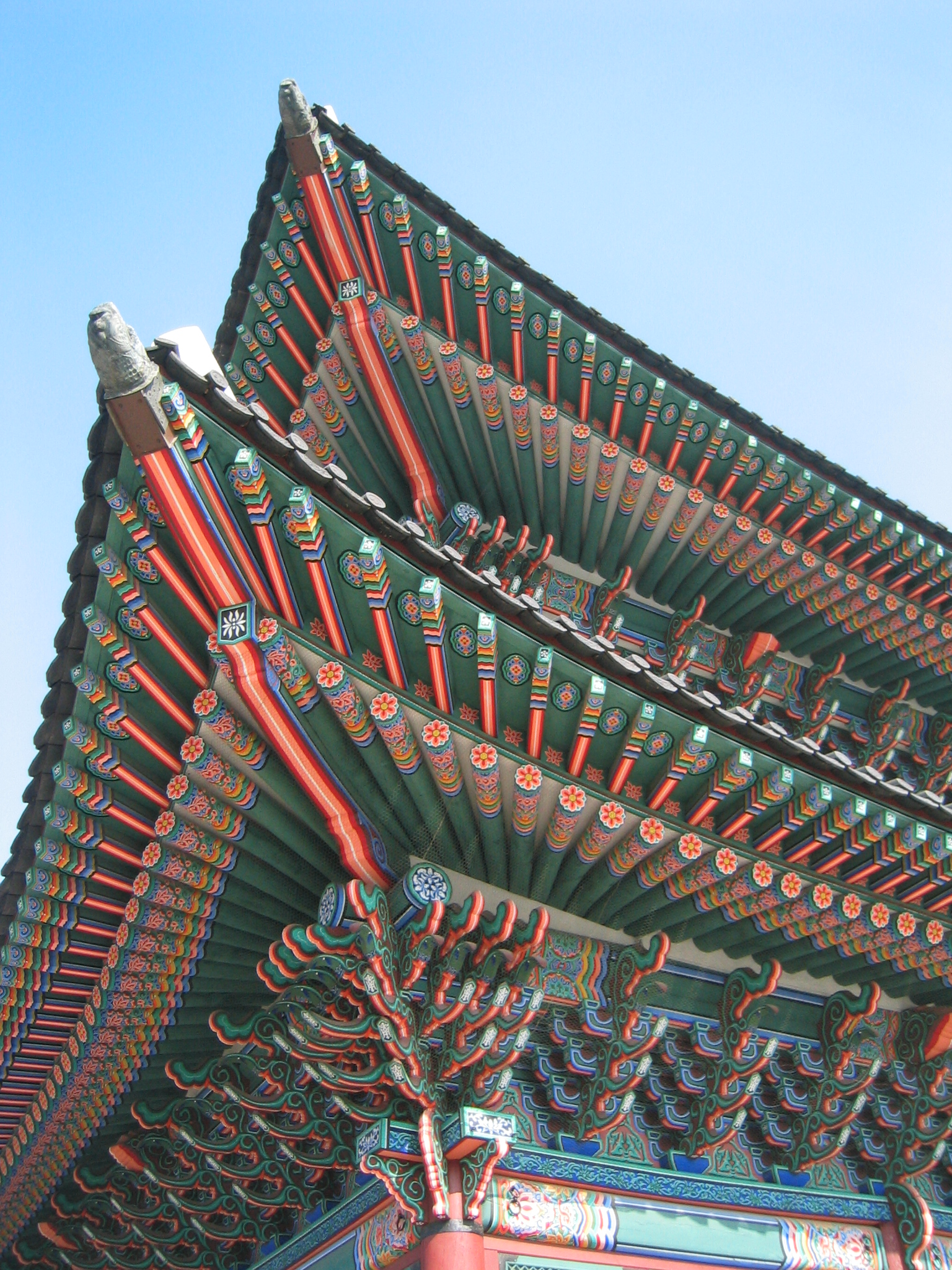
Dancheong, decorative paintings on a building at Gyeongbokgung

The traditional culture of Korea is the shared cultural and historical heritage of Korea before the division of Korea in 1945.

Since the mid-20th century, Korea has been split between the North Korean and South Korean states, resulting in a number of cultural differences that can be observed even today. Before the Joseon period, the practice of Korean shamanism was deeply rooted in Korean culture.

== Clothing ==
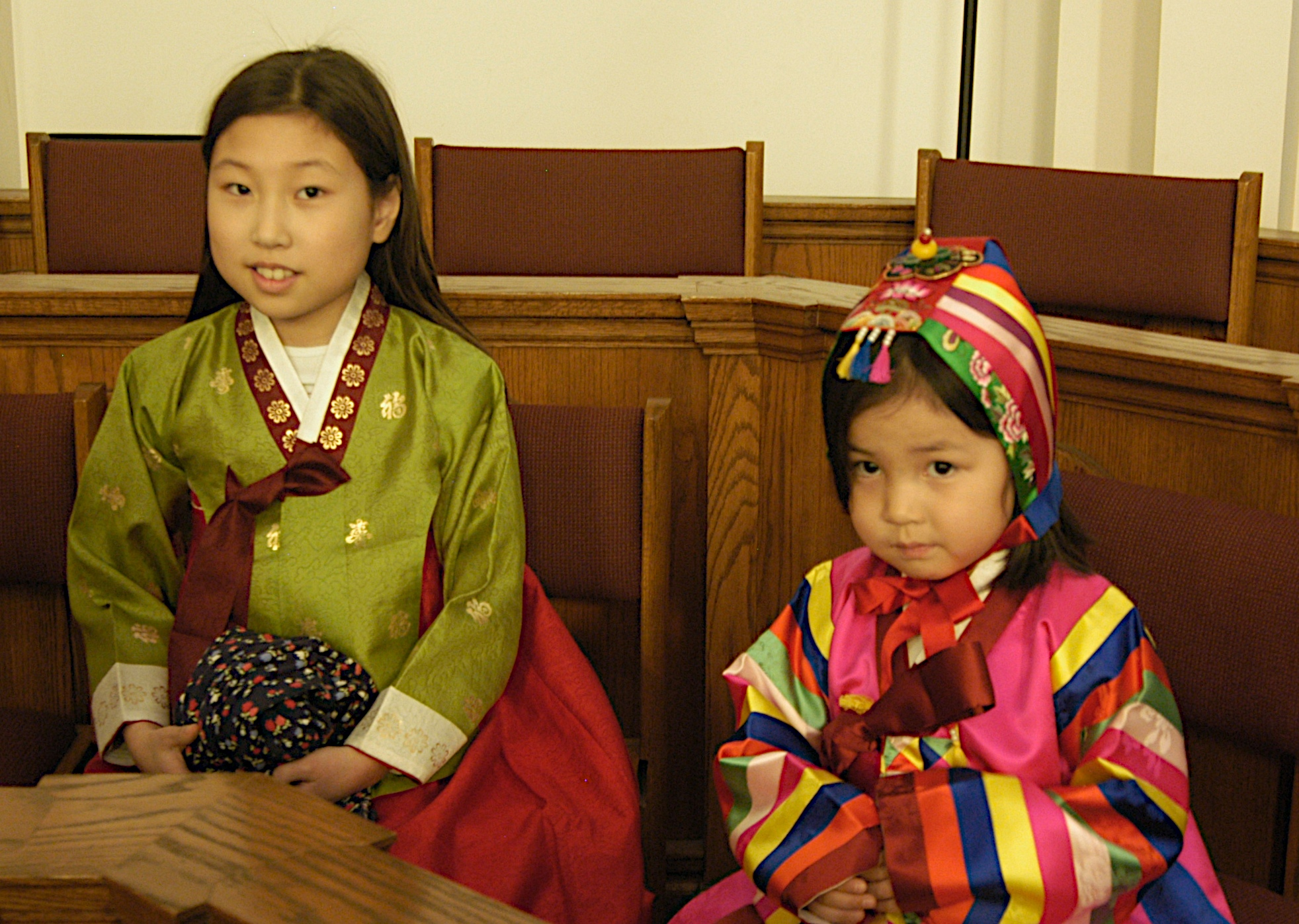
Hanbok

The traditional dress known as hanbok (한복; 韓服; alternatively joseonot; 조선옷 in North Korea) has been worn since ancient times. The hanbok consists of a shirt (jeogori) and a skirt (chima).

According to social status, Koreans used to dress differently, making clothing an important mark of social rank. Costumes were worn by the ruling class and the royal family. These upper classes also used jewelry to distance themselves from the ordinary people. A traditional item of jewellery for women was a pendant in the shape of certain elements of nature which was made of gemstones, to which a tassel of silk was connected.

For thousands of years, Korean people nearly exclusively wore plain white and undecorated hanbok. Color and ornamentation were only worn if required for a uniform, to display social status, or during special occasions. This led to the development of the nickname "white-clothed people" to describe Koreans. This practice possibly began around the Three Kingdoms of Korea period and lasted until just after the Korean War, after which it ended due to poverty. The basic everyday dress was shared by everyone, but distinctions were drawn in official and ceremonial clothes. During the winter people wore cotton-wadded dresses. Fur was also common.

Hanbok are classified according to their purposes: everyday dress, ceremonial dress and special dress. Ceremonial dresses are worn on formal occasions, including a child's first birthday (doljanchi), a wedding or a funeral. Special dresses are made for purposes such as shamans, officials.

Today the hanbok is still worn during formal occasions. The everyday use of the dress, however, has been lost. However, the elderly still dress in hanbok as well as active estates of the remnant of aristocratic families from the Joseon Dynasty, though this may be changing with something of a modern interest in the traditional dress among some of the young.

Traditionally, the hanbok was a wedding dress that dates back to the 14th century. It was a floor-length gown with an empire waist, fitted jacket, and sewn with vibrant or pastel colors. The use of the Hanbok in daily wear has dropped significantly over the last handful of decades.

In recent years, with the rise of attention to K-Pop, (Korean Pop Music), interest in Korean culture has spiked to an all-time high. Many groups, such as BTS, BlackPink, KARD, and many more, have been praised for showing their culture and heritage by wearing Hanbok in music videos, award shows, and other public appearances.

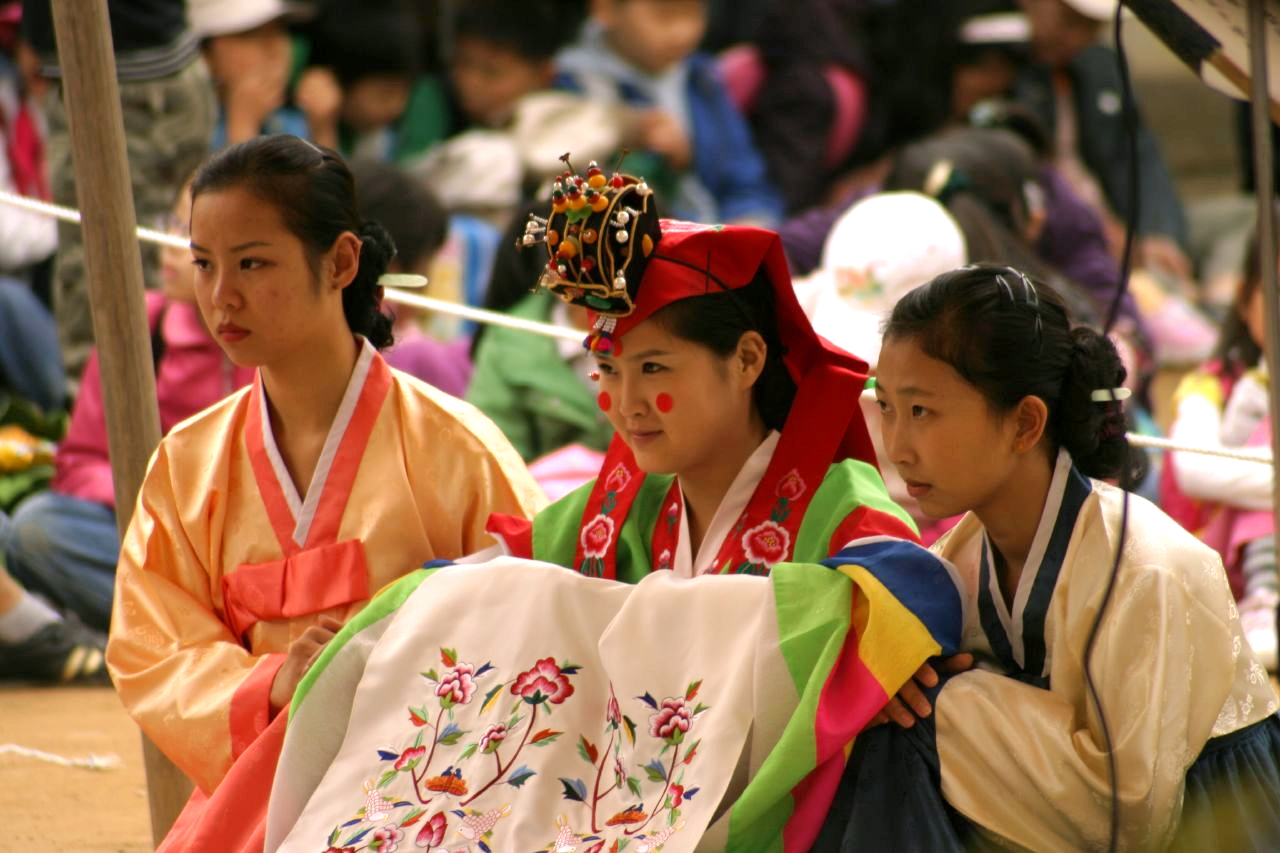
Hwarot, bridal robe

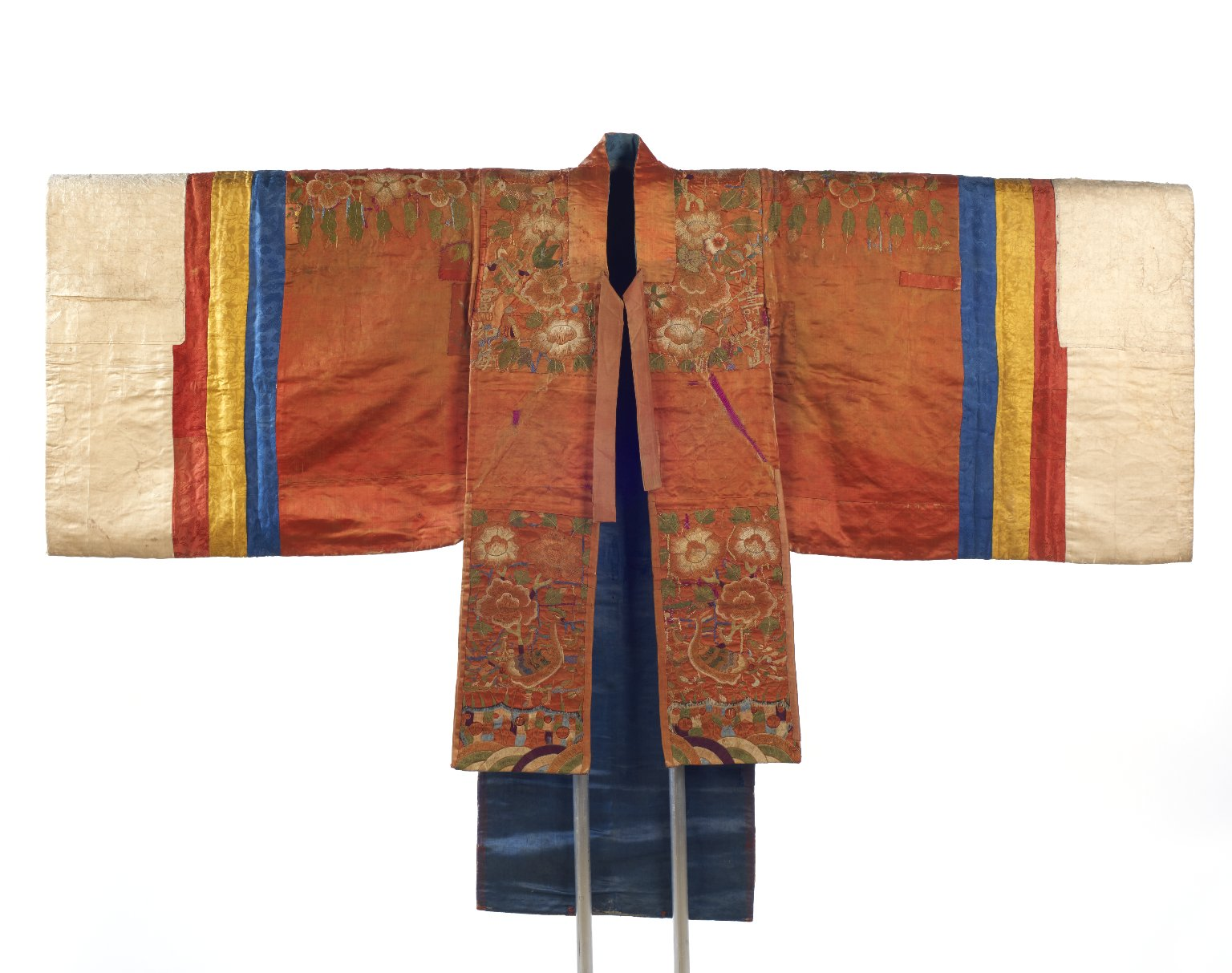
Bride's Robe (Hwalot), 19th century, Brooklyn Museum

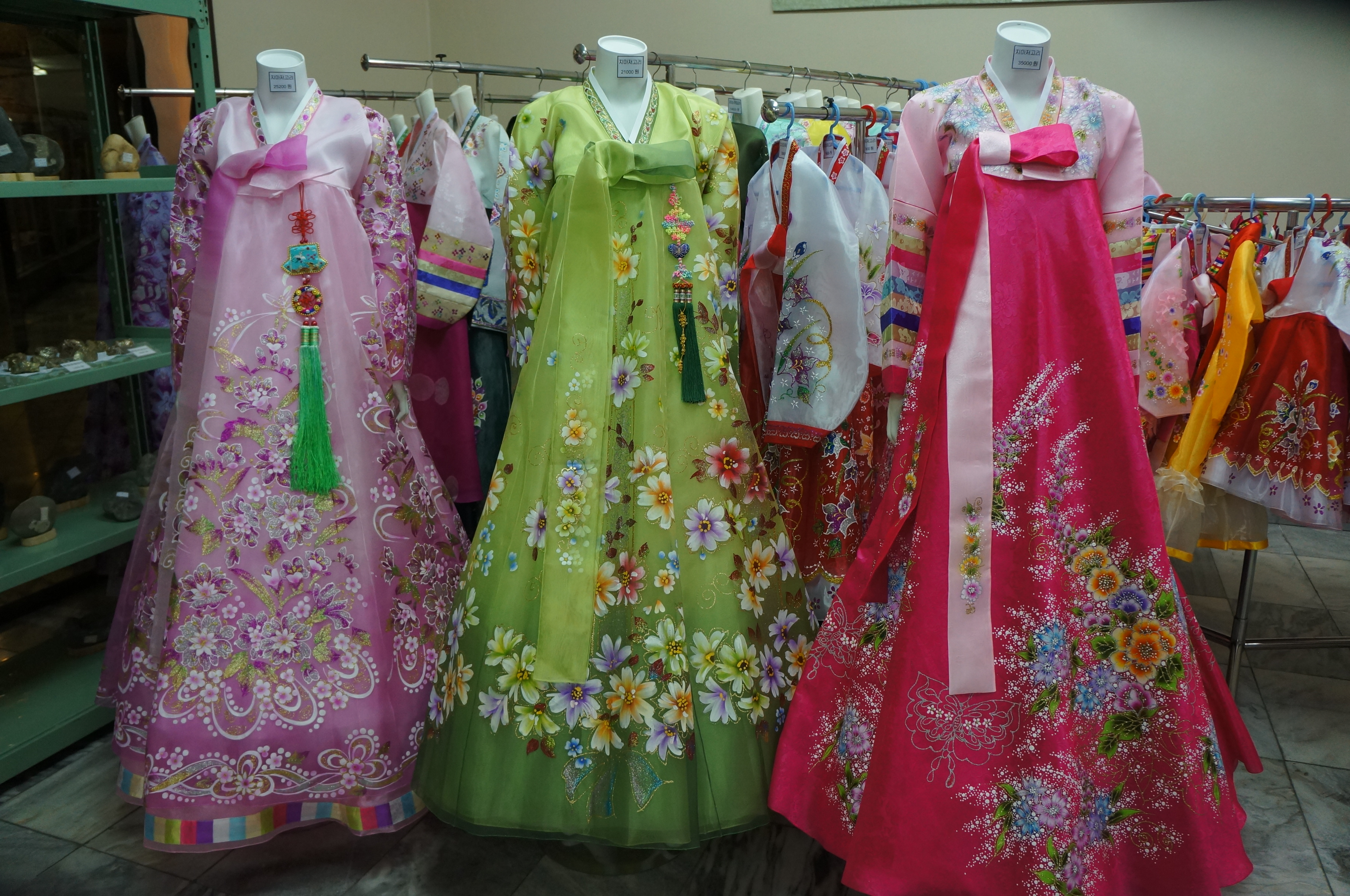
North Korean Chosŏn-ot on display

== Cuisine ==
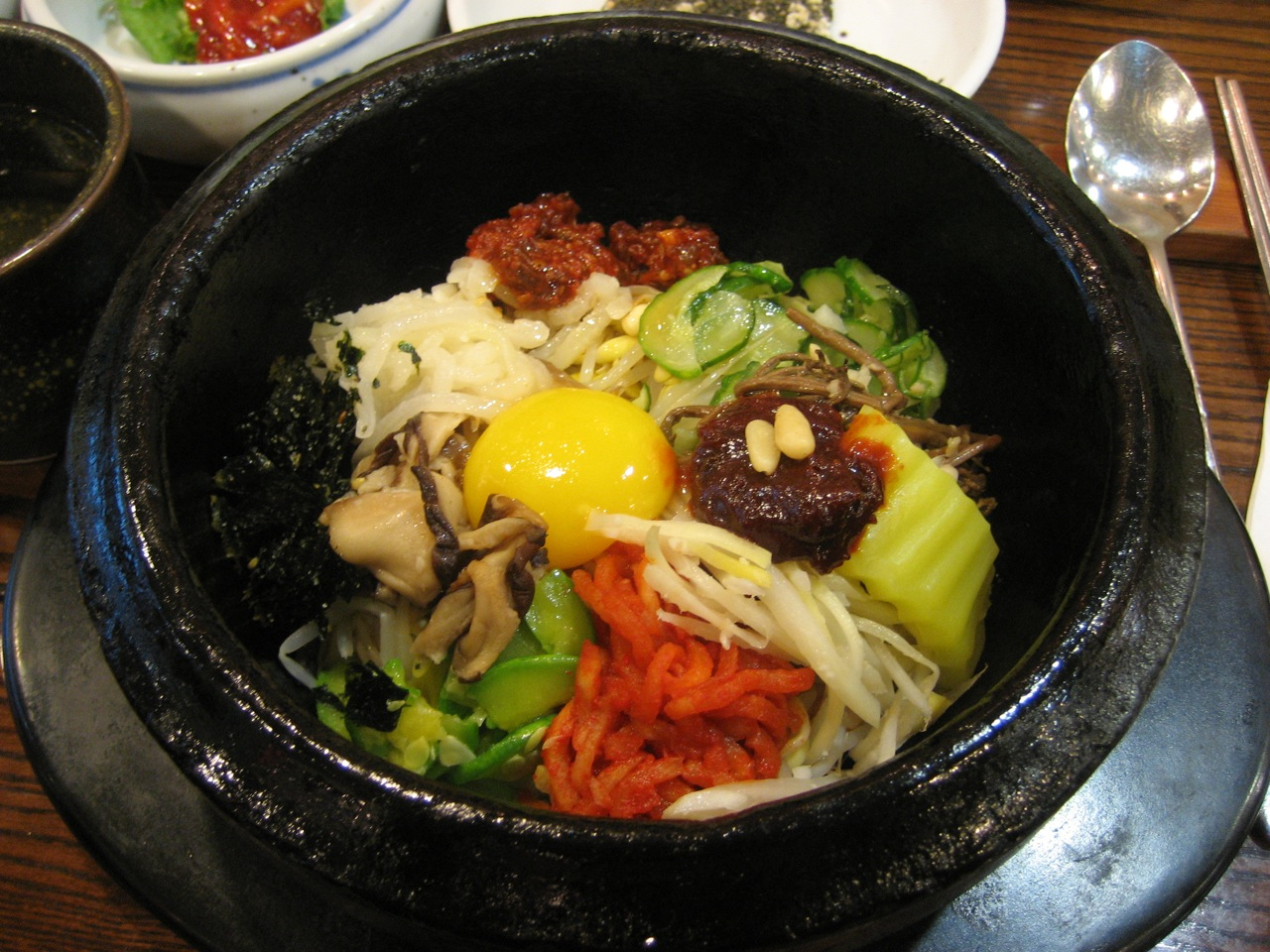
Bibimbap

Rice is the staple food of Korea. Having been an almost exclusively agricultural country until recently, the essential recipes in Korea are shaped by this experience. The main crops in Korea are rice, barley, and beans, but many supplementary crops are used. Fish and other seafood are also important because Korea is a peninsula.

Fermented recipes were also developed in early times and often characterize traditional Korean food. These include pickled fish and pickled vegetables. This kind of food provides essential proteins and vitamins during the winter.

Kimchi is one of the famous foods of Korea. Kimchi is pickled vegetables which contain vitamins A and C, thiamine, riboflavin, iron, calcium, carotene, etc. There are many types of kimchi, including cabbage kimchi, diced radish kimchi, water kimchi, and cucumber kimchi.

Side Dishes or (Banchan) are commonly eaten with meals in Korea. The main dish is almost always served with side dishes. Some commonly eaten side dishes are: Kimchi, Pickled Radish, Soybean Sprouts, Glass Noodles (Japchae), Cucumber Salad, and Seasoned Spinach.

=== Ceremonial, ritual and temple foods ===
A number of dishes have been developed. These can be divided into ceremonial foods and ritual foods. Ceremonial foods are used when a child reaches 100 days, at the first birthday, at a wedding ceremony, and the sixtieth birthday. Ritual foods are used at funerals, at ancestral rites, shaman's offerings and as temple food.

A distinguishing characteristic of Temple Food is that it does not use the common five strong-flavoured ingredients of Korean cuisine--(garlic, spring onion, wild rocambole, leek, and ginger), and meat.

For ceremonies and rituals, rice cakes are vital. The colouring of the food and the ingredients of the recipes are matched with a balance of yin and yang.

=== Royal court cuisine (surasang) ===
Today, surasang (traditional court cuisine) is available to the whole population. In the past, vegetable dishes were essential. However, meat consumption has increased. Traditional dishes include ssambap, bulgogi, sinseollo, kimchi, bibimbap, and gujeolpan.

=== Tea ===
Originally tea was used for ceremonial purposes or as part of traditional herbal medicine. Some of teas made of fruits, leaves, seeds or roots are enjoyed. Five tastes of tea are distinguished in Korea: sweet, sour, salty, bitter, and pungent.

== Festivals ==
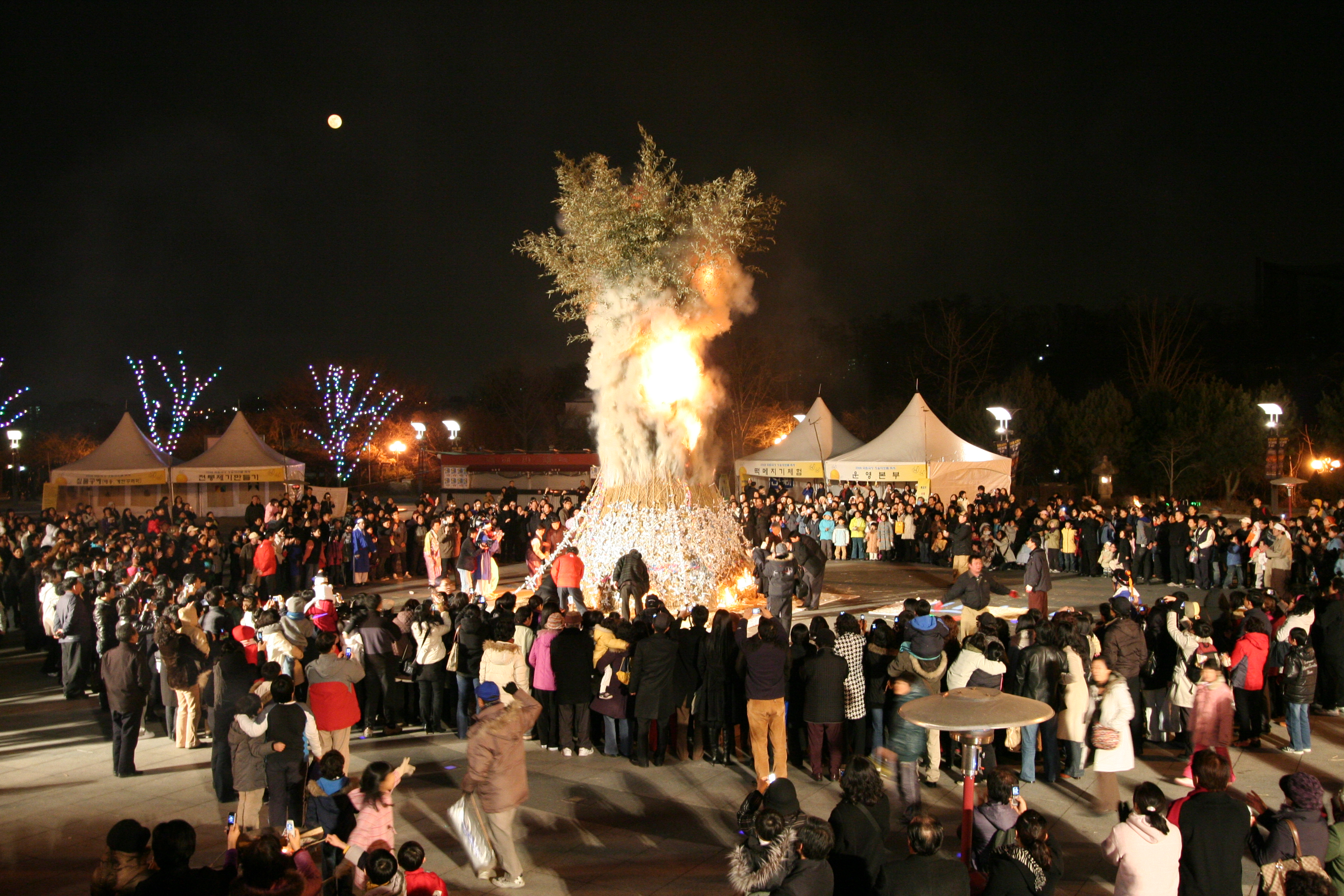
Daeboreum

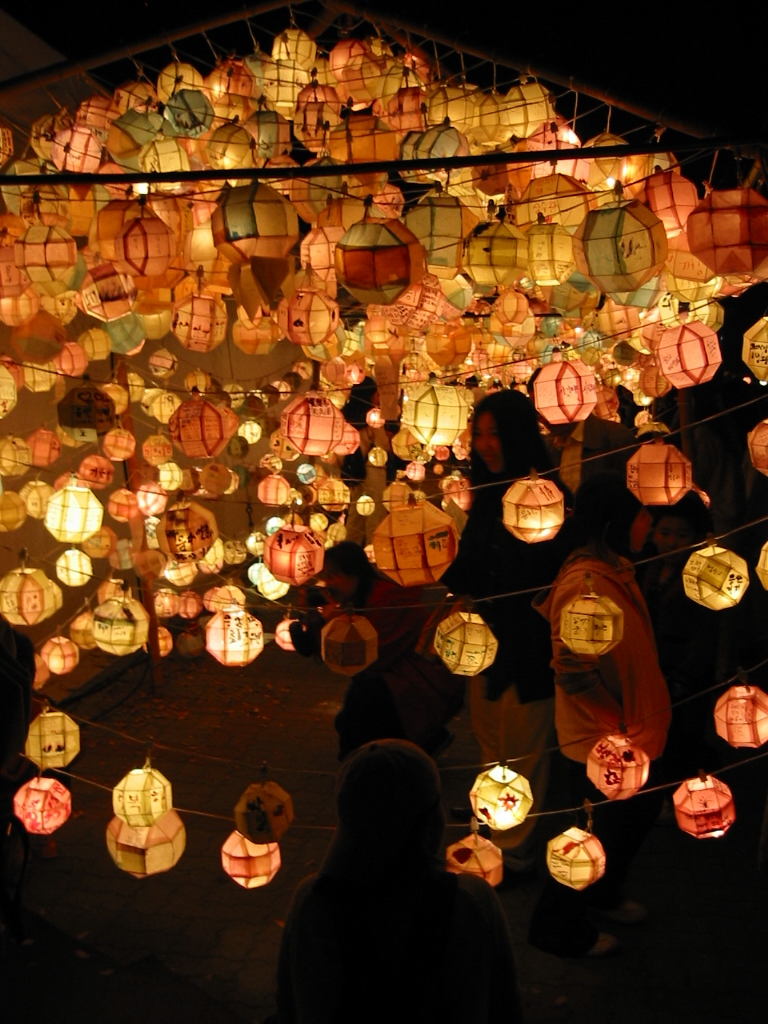
Lotus lantern festival

The traditional Korean calendar was based on the lunisolar calendar. Dates are calculated from Korea's meridian. Observances and festivals are rooted in Korean culture. The Korean lunar calendar is divided into 24 turning points (절기, jeolgi), each lasting about 15 days. The lunar calendar was the timetable for the agrarian society in the past, but is vanishing in the modern Korean lifestyle.

The Gregorian calendar was officially adopted in 1895, but traditional holidays and age reckoning are still based on the old calendar. Older generations still celebrate their birthdays according to the lunar calendar.

The biggest festival in Korea today is Seollal (the traditional Korean New Year). Other important festivals include Daeboreum (the first full moon), Dano (spring festival), and Chuseok (harvest festival). In 2023, these five festivals were designed as National Intangible Cultural Heritage.

There are also a number of regional festivals, celebrated according to the lunar calendar.

== Fine arts ==
=== Ceramics ===
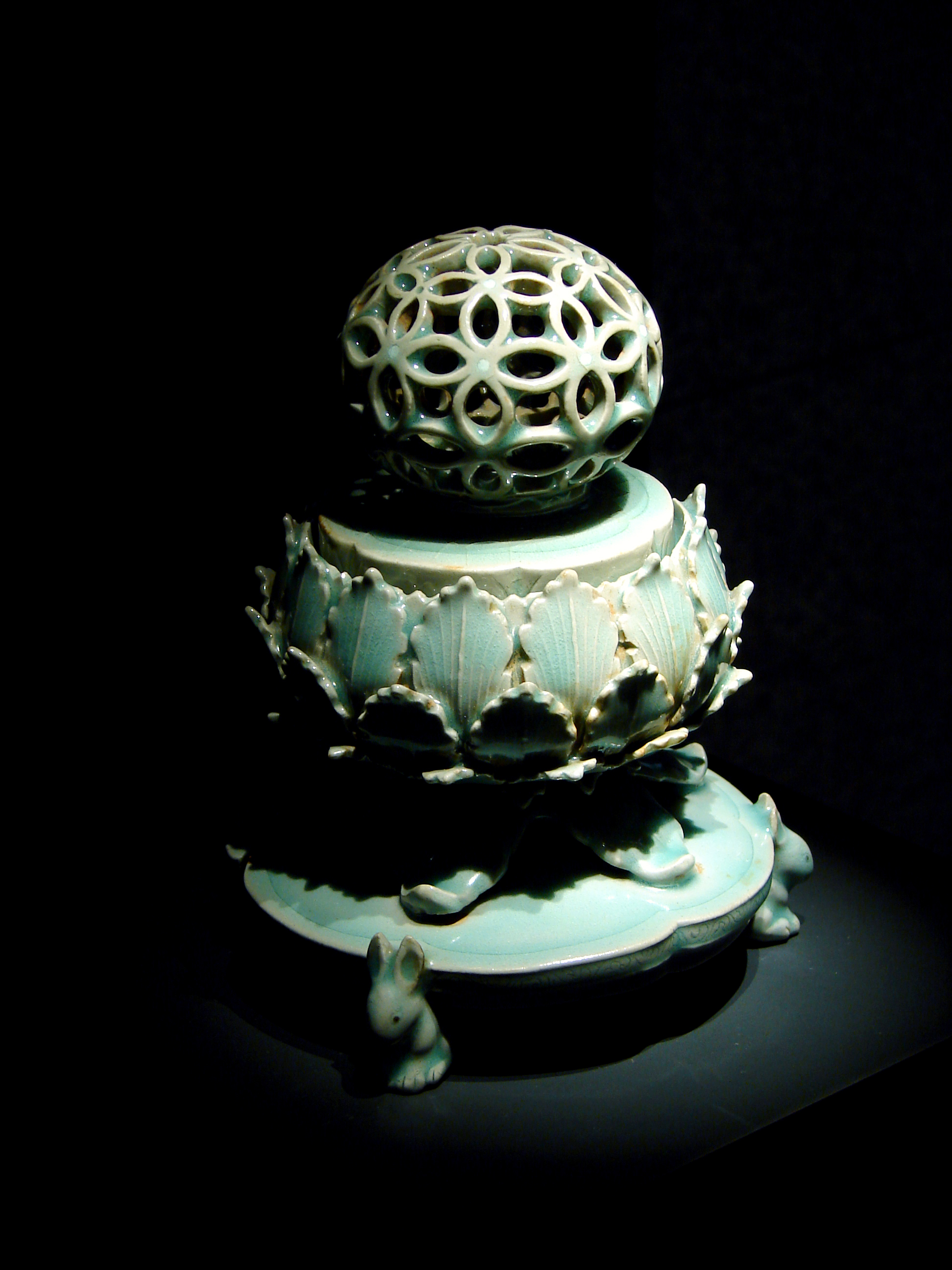
A celadon incense burner from the Goryeo period with Korean kingfisher glaze

In the Goryeo period, jade green celadon ware became more popular. In the 12th century, sophisticated methods of inlaying were invented, allowing more elaborate decorations in different colors. In Arts of Korea, Evelyn McCune states, "During the twelfth century, the production of ceramic ware reached its highest refinement. Several new varieties appeared simultaneously in the quarter of a century, one of which, the inlaid ware must be considered a Korean invention." William Bowyer Honey of the Victoria and Albert Museum of England after World War II wrote, "The best Corean (Korean) wares were not only original, they are the most gracious and unaffected pottery ever made.

White porcelain became popular in the 15th century and soon overtook celadon ware. White porcelain was commonly painted or decorated with copper.

During the Imjin wars in the 16th century, Korean potters were brought back to Japan where they heavily influenced Japanese ceramics. Many Japanese pottery families today can trace their art and ancestry to these Korean potters whom the Japanese captured during its attempted conquests of the Korean peninsula.

In the late Joseon period (late 17th century) blue-and-white porcelain became popular. Designs were painted in cobalt blue on white porcelain.

=== Crafts ===
There is a unique set of handicrafts produced in Korea. Most of the handicrafts are created for particular everyday use, often giving priority to practical use rather than aesthetics. Traditionally, metal, wood, fabric, lacquerware, and earthenware were the main materials used, but later glass, leather or paper have sporadically been used.

Many sophisticated and elaborate handicrafts have been excavated, including gilt crowns, patterned pottery, pots or ornaments. During the Goryeo period the use of bronze was advanced. Brass, that is copper with one third zinc, has been a particularly popular material. The dynasty, however, is most prominently renowned for its use of celadon ware.

During the Joseon period, popular handicrafts included porcelain decorated with blue painting. Woodcraft was also advanced during that period. This led to more sophisticated pieces of furniture, including wardrobes, chests, tables, and drawers. It is part of a craft that goes back well over a millennium, keeping alive a tradition dating back to at least the seventeenth century. It is this tradition that has made Korean furniture widely sought after by antique dealers and collectors worldwide. Immediately recognizable as Korean, this art became known to the West in the late 1940s and 1950s.

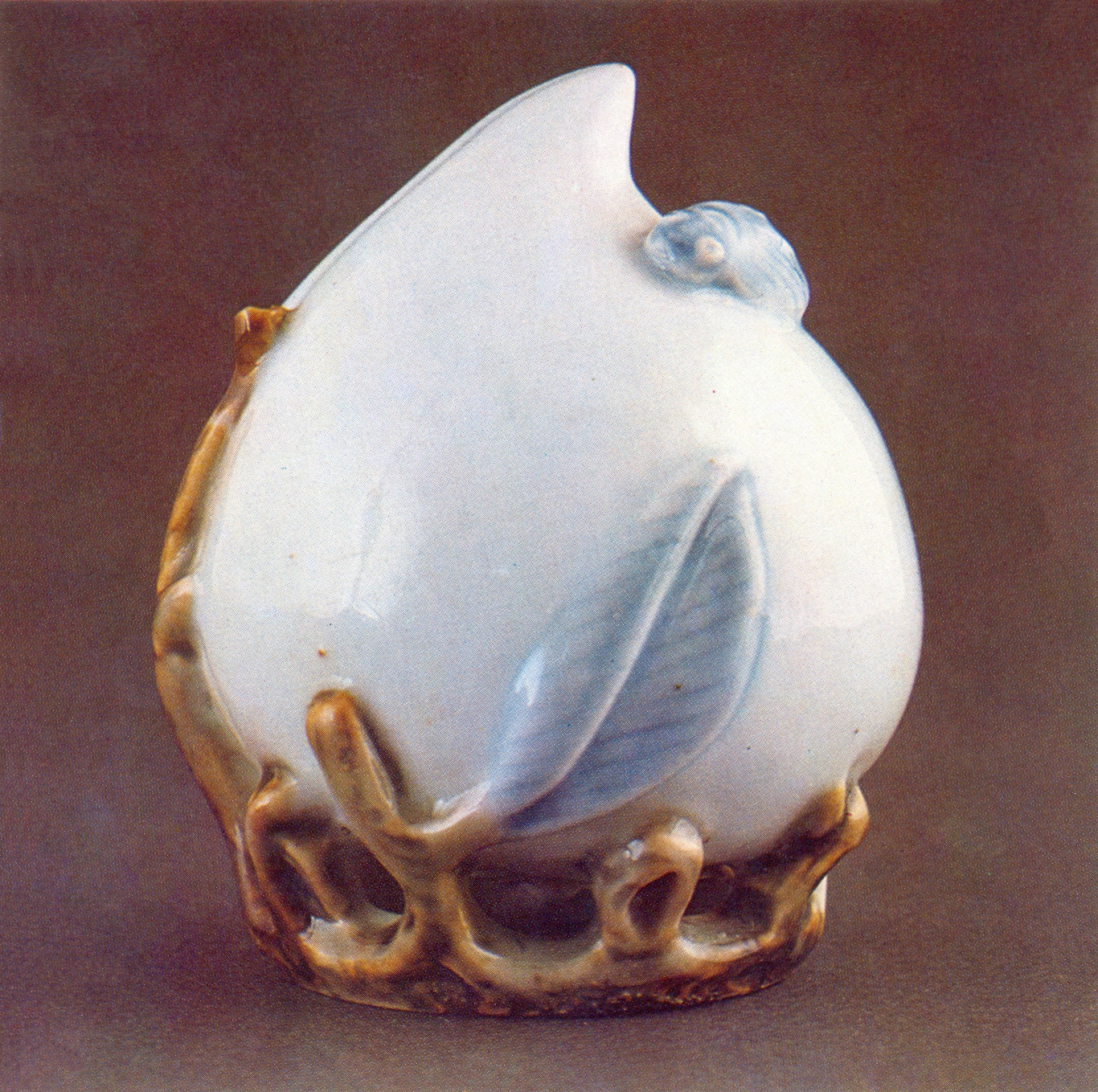
Blue and White Porcelain Peach-Shaped Water Dropper from the Joseon Dynasty 18th century

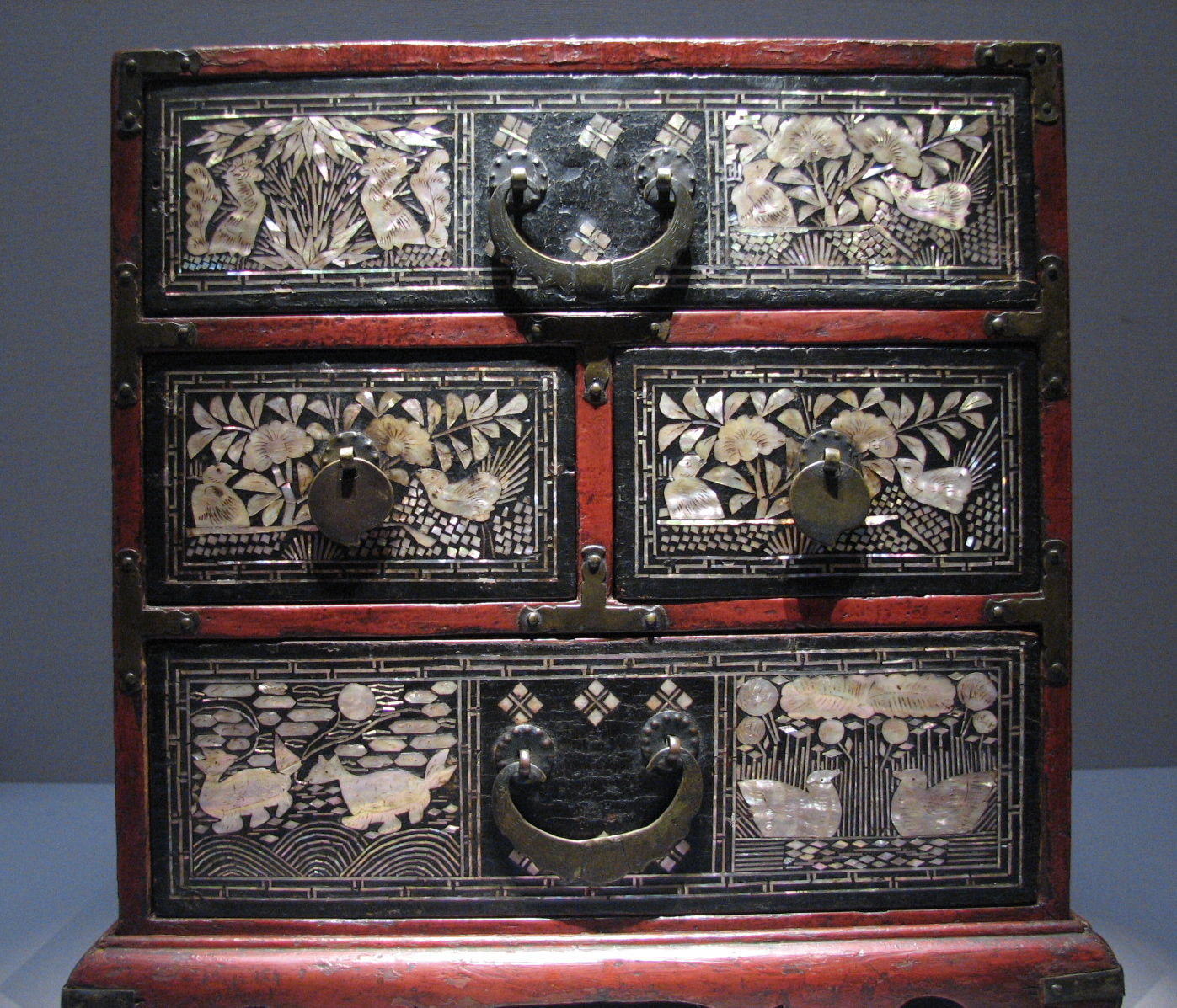
Lacquer drawer with mother-of-pearl inlay, at the National Museum of Korea in Seoul

=== Dance and martial arts ===
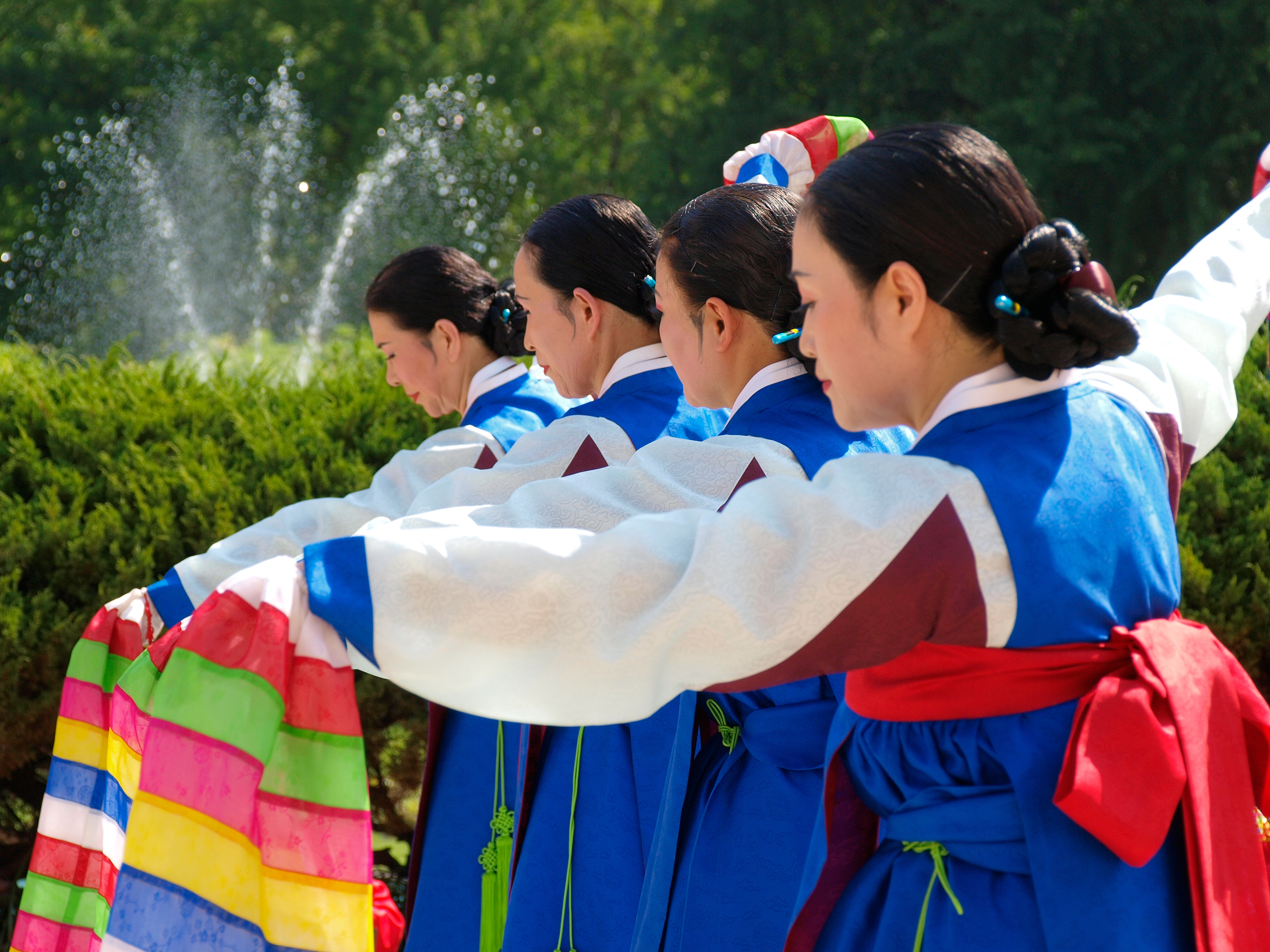
Jinju geommu

In Korea, there is a distinction between court dance and folk dance. Common court dances are jeongjaemu (정재무) performed at banquets, and ilmu (일무), performed at Korean Confucian rituals. Jeongjaemu is divided into native dances (향악정재, hyangak jeongjae) and forms imported from Central Asia and China (당악정재, dangak jeongjae). Ilmu are divided into civil dance (문무, munmu) and military dance (무무, mumu). Many mask dramas and mask dances are performed in many regional areas of Korea. The traditional clothing is the genja, it is a special kind of dress that women wear on festivals. It is pink with multiple symbols around the neck area.

Traditional choreography of court dances is reflected in many contemporary productions, and the strong dance tradition in the country carries on to this day, with many dance groups forming over the last few decades.

Taekkyon, a traditional Korean martial art, is central to the classic Korean dance. Taekkyon, being a complete system of integrated movement, found its core techniques adaptable to mask, dance and other traditional artforms of Korea. Taekwondo, a Korean martial art, began in the 1940s in Korea.

=== Painting ===
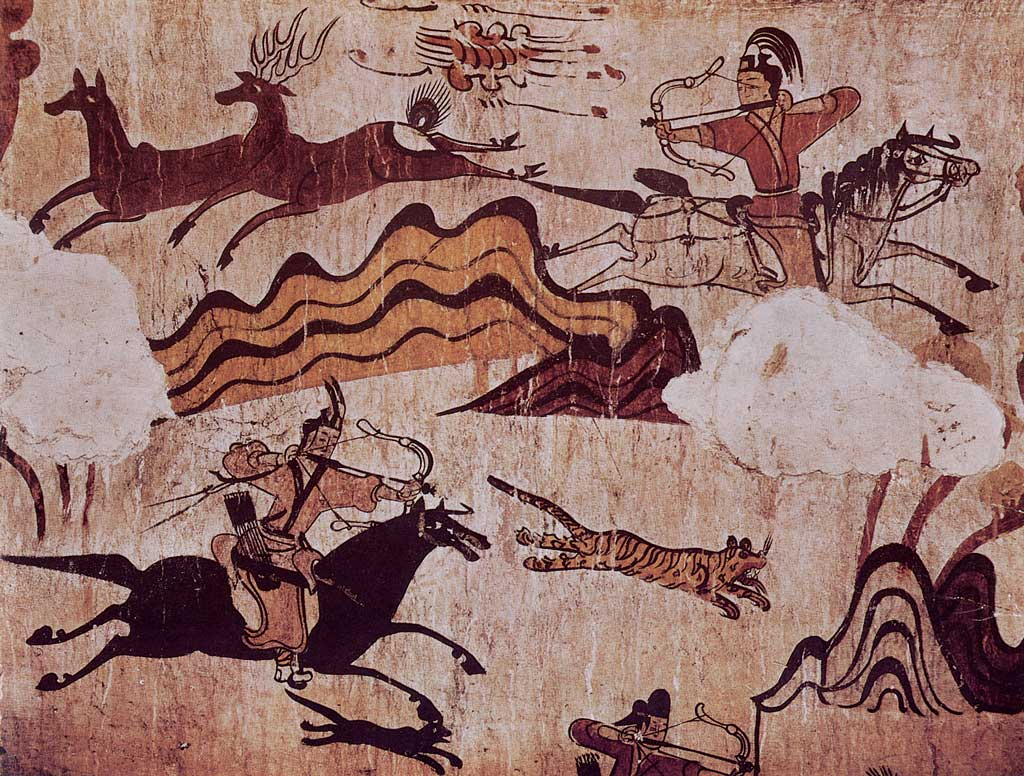
Korean horseback archery in the fifth century

The earliest paintings found on the Korean peninsula are petroglyphs of prehistoric times. With the arrival of Buddhism from India via China, different techniques were introduced. These techniques quickly established themselves as the mainstream techniques, but indigenous techniques still survived. Among them were the Goguryeo tomb murals. These murals inside many of the tombs are an invaluable insight into the ceremonies, warfare, architecture, and daily life of ancient Goguryeo people. Balhae kingdom, a successor state of Goguryeo, absorbed much of traditional Goguryeo elements.

There is a tendency towards naturalism with subjects such as realistic landscapes, flowers and birds being particularly popular. Ink is the most common material used, and it is painted on mulberry paper or silk. Humorous details are sometimes present.

In the 18th century, indigenous techniques were advanced, particularly in calligraphy and seal engraving.

During the Joseon period, new genres of Korean painting flourished, such as chaekgeori (paintings of books) and munjado (paintings of letters), revealing the infatuation with books and learning in Korean culture.

Arts are both influenced by tradition and realism. For example, Han's near-photographic "Break Time at the Ironworks" shows muscular men dripping with sweat and drinking water from tin cups at a sweltering foundry. Jeong Son's "Peak Chonnyo of Mount Kumgang" is a classical Korean landscape of towering cliffs shrouded by mists.

=== Music ===
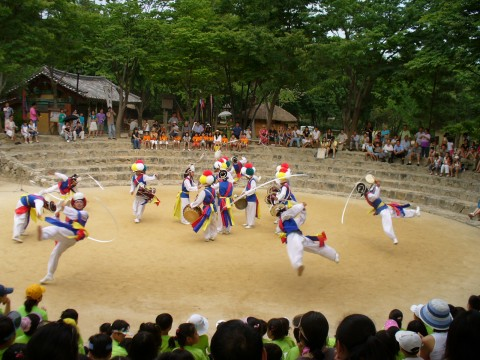
Pungmul

There is a genre distinction between folk music and court music. Korean folk music is varied and complex in different ways, but all forms of folk music maintain a set of rhythms (called 장단; Jangdan) and a loosely defined set of melodic modes. Korean folk music is Pansori (판소리) performed by one singer and one drummer. Occasionally, there might be dancers and narrators. They have been designated an intangible cultural property in UNESCO's Memory of the world, and Pungmul (풍물) performed by drumming, dancing and singing. Samul Nori is a type of Korean traditional music based on Pungmul, and Sanjo (산조) that is played without a pause in faster tempos. Nongak (농악) means "farmers' music".

Korean court music can be traced to the beginning of the Joseon Dynasty in 1392. Korean court musics include A-ak, Dang-ak and Hyang-ak. The traditional Korean music is still played and sung a lot.

== Gardens ==
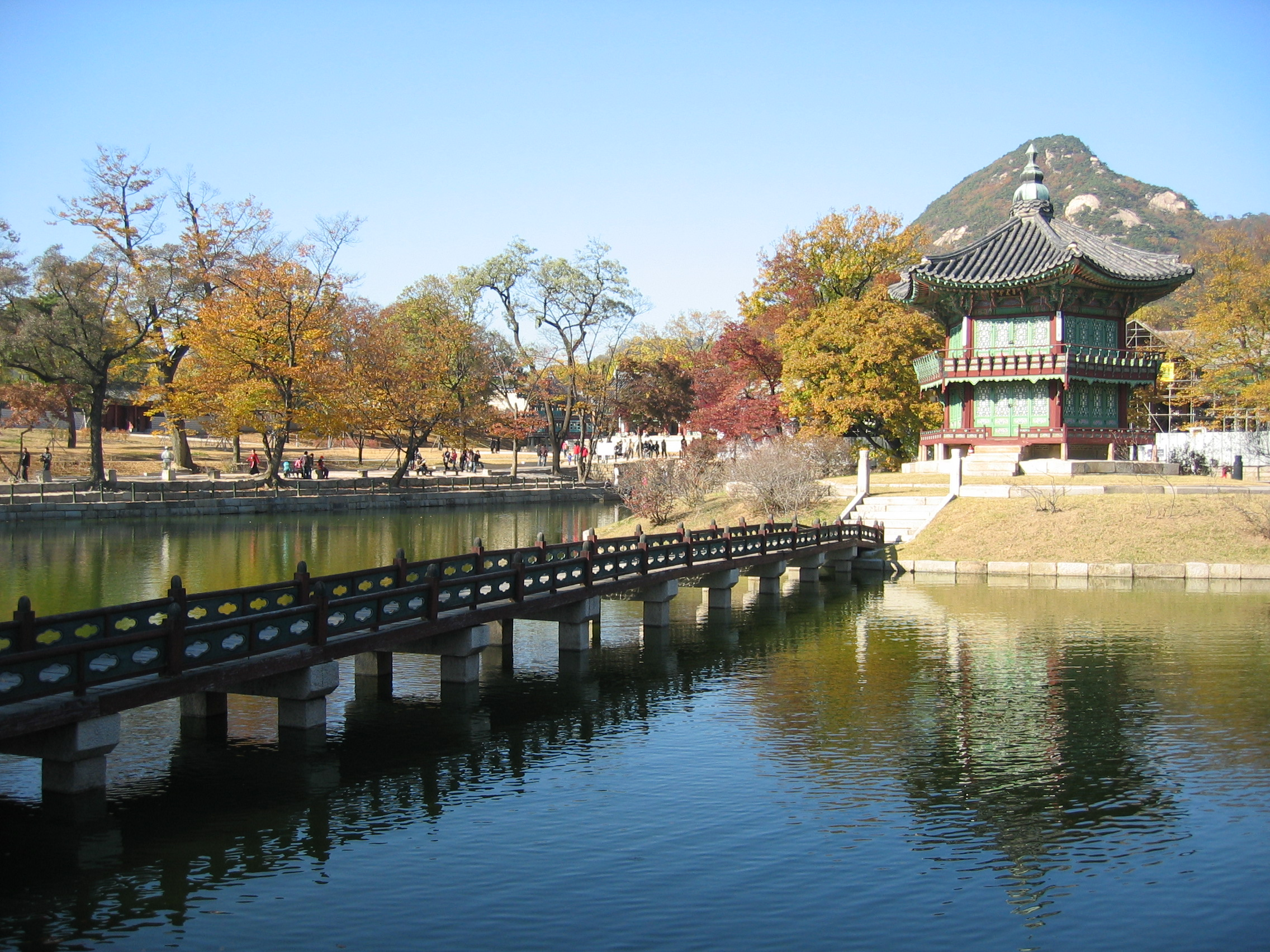
Hyangwonjeong, a garden in Gyeongbokgung, Seoul

The principles of temple gardens and private gardens are the same. Korean gardening in East Asia is influenced by primarily Korean Shamanism and Korean folk religion.

The lotus pond is an important feature in the Korean garden. If there is a natural stream, often a pavilion is built next to it, allowing the pleasure of watching the water. Terraced flower beds are a common feature in traditional Korean gardens.

The Poseokjeong site near Gyeongju was built in the Silla period. It highlights the importance of water in traditional Korean gardens. The garden of Poseokjeong features an abalone-shaped watercourse. During the last days of the Silla kingdom, the king's guests would sit along the watercourse and chat while wine cups were floated during banquets.

== Houses ==
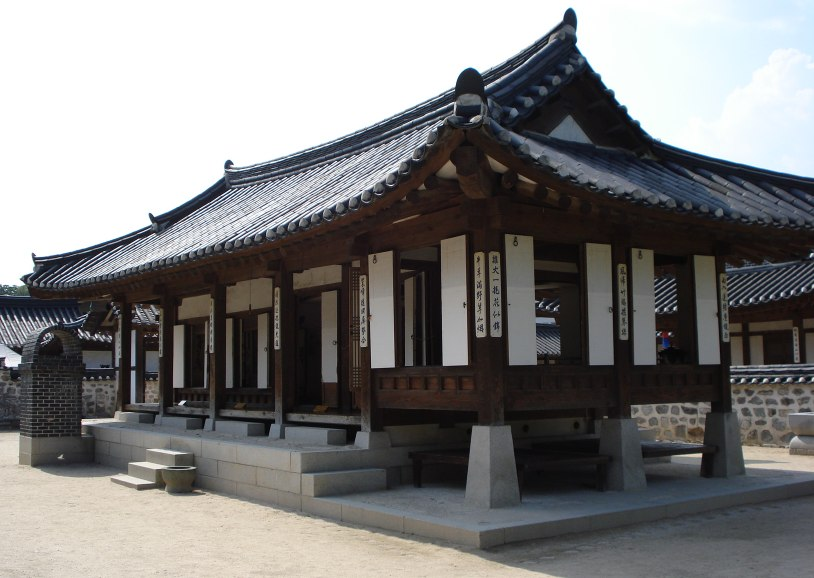
Traditional house, hanok (한옥)

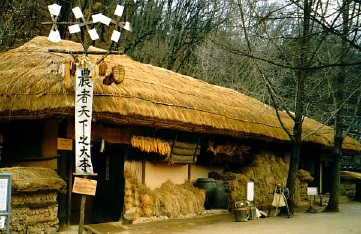
Traditional farmer's house; Folk Village, Seoul

Korean traditional houses are called Hanok (한옥). Sites of residence are traditionally selected using traditional geomancy. While the geomancy had been a vital part of Korean culture and Korean Shamanism since prehistoric times, geomancy was later re-introduced by China during the Three Kingdoms period of Korea's history.

A house is built against a hill and face south to receive as much sunlight as possible. This orientation is still preferred in modern Korea. Geomancy also influences the shape of the building, the direction it faces, and the material the house is constructed with.

Traditional Korean houses can be structured into an inner wing (안채, anchae) and an outer wing (사랑채, sarangchae). The individual layout largely depends on the region and the wealth of the family. Whereas aristocrats used the outer wing for receptions, poorer people kept cattle in the sarangchae. The wealthier a family, the larger the house. However, it was forbidden to any family except for the king to have a residence of more than 99 kan. A kan is the distance between two pillars used in traditional houses.

The inner wing normally consisted of a living room, a kitchen, and a wooden-floored central hall. More rooms may be attached to this. Poorer farmers would not have any outer wings. Floor heating (온돌, ondol) has been used in Korea since prehistoric times. The main building materials are wood, clay, tile, stone, and thatch. Because wood and clay were the most common materials used in the past not many old buildings have survived into present times.

== Religious beliefs ==
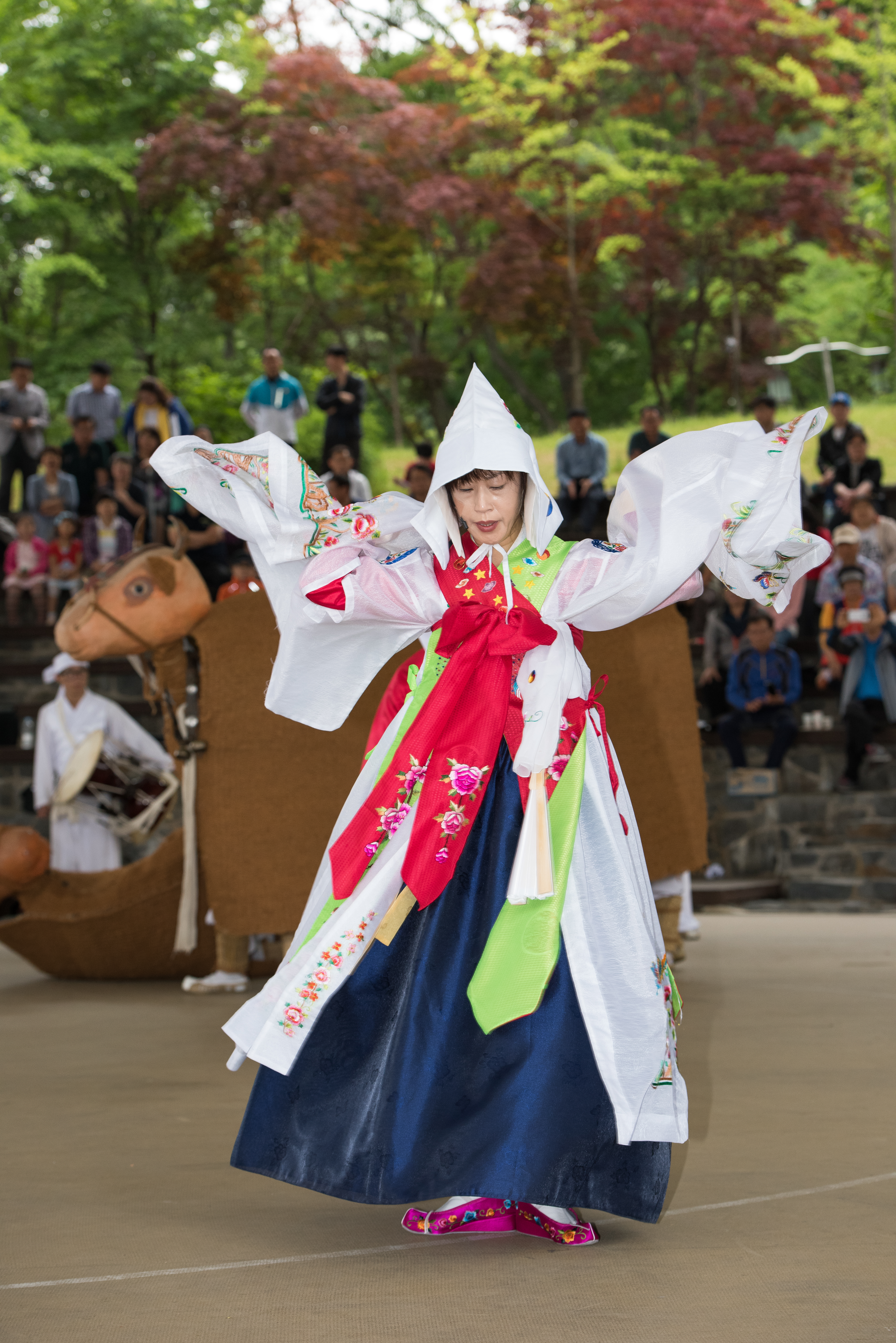
A mudang performing a kut ritual in Yangju, South Korea.

Korean shamanism, or musok (무속; 巫俗), is one of the oldest religions in Korea, and still survives to this day. Practitioners of Korean shamanism are usually female, though male shamans do exist as well. Korean shamans of either gender can be called mudang or mansin, while paksu is a term only for a male shaman. The two main ways one becomes a shaman are either hereditarily, or by suffering through mubyŏng ("spirit possession sickness"). The main role of the mudang is to perform rituals, or kut, to achieve various means, including healing, divination, and spirit pacification. Simultaneously a religious affair and a visual and auditory spectacle, kut are full of bright colors, elaborate costumes, altars piled high with ritual food and alcohol, various forms of singing and dancing accompanied by traditional instruments, and props including fans, bells, and knives. While the most well-known rituals are characterized by spirit possession, for most hereditary shamans, as well as in some regional variations, the shaman's role is to honor the spirits and deities rather than be possessed by them.

Despite the social stigma surrounding the performance of a kut even today, there are still many clients who are willing, though potentially ashamed, to pay immense sums to enlist the help of a mansin when in need.

Throughout South Korea's political turmoil in the 20th century, musok stayed strong against systemic persecution. Indeed, several festivals and kut have been preserved as intangible cultural heritage under the 1962 Cultural Heritage Protection Act, and the esteemed mudang Kim Keum-hwa was designated as a Living National Treasure in 1985. In the 1970s and 80's, Korean shamanism was used as a form of protest against the government by the pro-democracy Popular Culture Movement. Whether willing to participate in political dissidence or not, under the movement's minjung ("the people") ideology, long-oppressed shamans were painted as the bearers of Korean culture who could also use their spirit-possession kut to give voice to those who had died for social justice causes.

In recent times, Korean shamanism is evolving, with its growing popularity in media today, and the adaptability of its practitioners in a modernized world. Mudang have more control over their public image, now using documentaries and television along with personal websites to advertise and present their own stories.

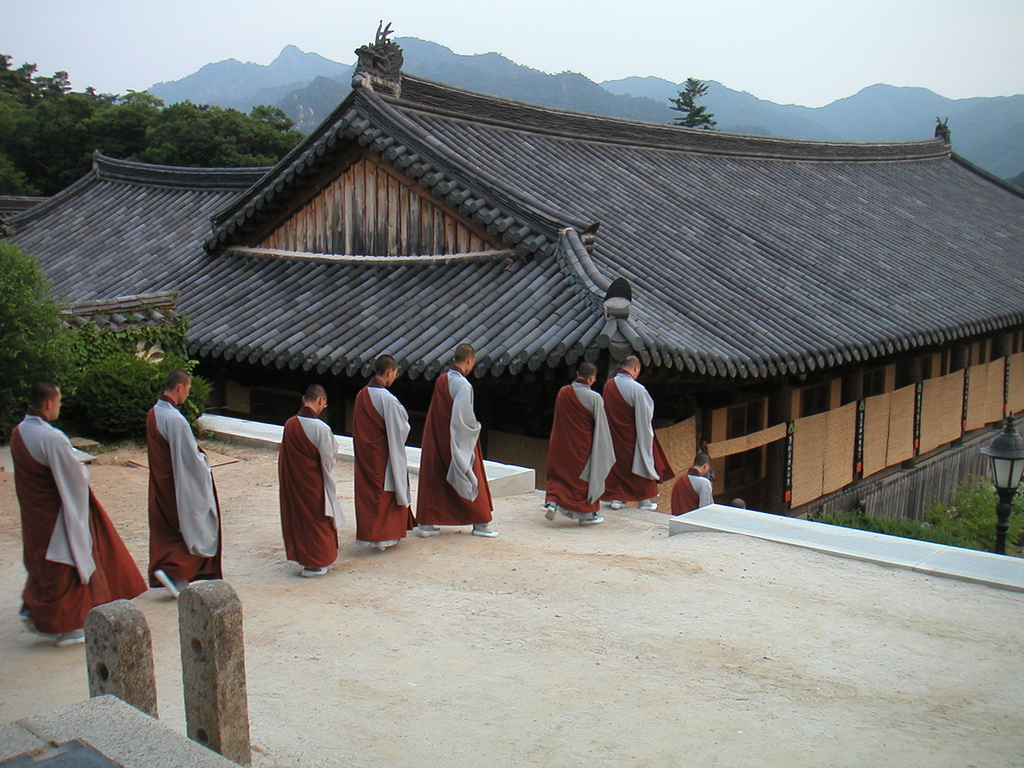
Monks going down to their rooms after evening prayers at Haeinsa.

Buddhism, Confucianism and Taoism were later introduced to Korea through cultural exchanges with Chinese dynasties. Buddhism was the official religion of the Goryeo dynasty, and many privileges were given to Buddhist monks during this period. However, the Joseon period saw the suppression of Buddhism, where Buddhist monks and temples were banned from the cities and confined to the countryside. In its place a strict form of Confucianism, which some see as even more strict than what had ever been adopted by the Chinese, became the official philosophy. Korean Confucianism was epitomized by the seonbi class, scholars who passed up positions of wealth and power to lead lives of study and integrity.

Throughout Korean history and culture, regardless of separation, the traditional beliefs of Korean Shamanism, Mahayana Buddhism and Confucianism have remained an underlying influence of the religion of the Korean people as well as a vital aspect of their culture. In fact, all these traditions coexisted peacefully for hundreds of years. They still exist in the more Christian South and in the North, despite pressure from its government.

=== Influence of Buddhism on culture and traditions ===
Korean culture is deeply influenced by the Buddhism as Buddhism has become inherent aspect of the Korea culture, including the secular Korean traditions followed by the non-Buddhist Koreans. A 2005 government survey indicated that about a quarter of South Koreans identified as Buddhist. However, the actual number of Buddhists in South Korea is ambiguous as there is no exact or exclusive criterion by which Buddhists can be identified, unlike the Christian population. With Buddhism's incorporation into traditional Korean culture, it is now considered a philosophy and cultural background rather than a formal religion. As a result, many people outside of the practicing population are deeply influenced by these traditions. Thus, when counting secular believers or those influenced by the faith while not following other religions, the number of Buddhists in South Korea is considered to be much larger. Similarly, in officially atheist North Korea, while Buddhists officially account for 4.5% of the population, a much larger number (over 70%) of the population are influenced by Buddhist philosophies and customs.

When Buddhism was originally introduced to Korea from Former Qin [the 4th century state in Northern China] in 372, about 800 years after the death of the historical Gautama Buddha [founder of Buddhism], shamanism [a religious practice] was the indigenous religion. The Samguk yusa and Samguk sagi record the following 3 monks who were among the first to bring Buddhist teaching, or Dharma, to Korea in the 4th century during the Three Kingdoms period: Malananta – an Indian Buddhist monk who came from Serindian area of southern China's Eastern Jin Dynasty and brought Buddhism to the King Baekje of Baekje in the southern Korean peninsula in 384 CE, Sundo – a monk from northern Chinese state Former Qin brought Buddhism to Goguryeo in northern Korea in 372 CE, and Ado – a monk who brought Buddhism to Silla in central Korea. As Buddhism was not seen to conflict with the rites of nature worship, it was allowed by adherents of Shamanism to be blended into their religion. Thus, the mountains that were believed by shamanists to be the residence of spirits in pre-Buddhist times later became the sites of Buddhist temples.

Though it initially enjoyed wide acceptance, even being supported as the state ideology during the Goryeo (918–1392 CE) period, Buddhism in Korea suffered extreme repression during the Joseon (1392–1897 CE) era, which lasted over five hundred years. During this period, Neo-Confucianism overcame the prior dominance of Buddhism. Only after Buddhist monks helped repel the Japanese invasions of Korea (1592–98) did the persecution of Buddhists stop. Buddhism in Korea remained subdued until the end of the Joseon period when its position was strengthened somewhat by the colonial period, which lasted from 1910 to 1945. However, these Buddhist monks did not only put an end to Japanese rule in 1945, but they also asserted their specific and separate religious identity by reforming their traditions and practices. They laid the foundation for many Buddhist societies, and the younger generation of monks came up with the ideology of Mingung Pulgyo, or "Buddhism for the people." The importance of this ideology is that it was coined by the monks who focused on common men's daily issues.

== Modern cultures ==
=== Culture of South Korea ===
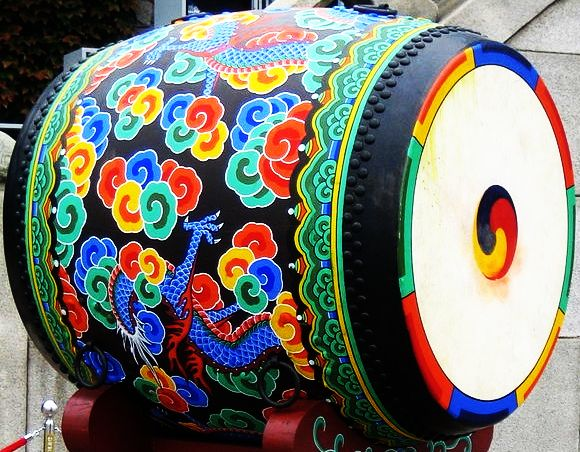
Large drum with Dancheong decorative painting

The contemporary culture of South Korea developed from the traditional culture of Korea which was prevalent in the early Korean nomadic tribes. By maintaining thousands of years of ancient Korean culture, South Korea has split on its own path of cultural development away from North Korean culture since the division of Korea in 1949. The industrialization, urbanization, and westernization of South Korea, especially Seoul, have brought many changes to the way Koreans live. Changing Economy of South Korea and lifestyles have led to a concentration of population in major cities and depopulation of the rural countryside, with multi-generational households separating into nuclear family living. Today, many Korean cultural elements, especially popular culture, have spread across the globe and have become some of the most prominent cultural forces in the world.

=== Culture of North Korea ===
In North Korea, a central theme of cultural expression is to take the best from the past and discard capitalist elements. Popular, vernacular styles and themes in the arts such as literature, art, music and dance are esteemed as expressing the truly unique spirit of the Korean nation.

Ethnographers, [i.e. people who do qualitative research that involves immersing yourself in a particular community or organisation to observe their behavior and interactions up close], devote much energy to restoring and reintroducing cultural forms that have the proper proletarian, or folk, spirit and that encourage the development of collective consciousness.

Proletarian refers to the Marxism study of the classes in terms of Capitalism including the Proletarians and Bourgeoisie. Other classes including landlords, petty bourgeoisie, peasants, and lumpenproletariat also exist but are not primary in terms of the dynamics of capitalism.

Last but not least, lively, optimistic musical and choreographic expressions are stressed when it comes to dance. Group folk dances and choral singing are traditionally practiced in some but not all parts of Korea. They were being promoted throughout North Korea in the early 1990s among schools and university students. Farmers' music bands have also been revived.

=== Culture of Yanbian Korean Autonomous Prefecture ===
Both Mandarin Chinese and Korean are used as official languages in Yanbian. Vice News described the prefecture as both "West Korea" and "The Third Korea" due to the prominence of both North and South Korean culture.

The Museum of Yanbian Korean Autonomous Prefecture was planned in 1960, and constructed in 1982. It contains over 10,000 exhibits, including 11 first-level artifacts. The exhibits' labels and explanations are in 2 languages, which is in Korean and Chinese. Guided tours are also available in both of these languages.

== High-Context Culture in South Korea ==
In Korea, high-context culture is prominent in the society as it is a very important part of their culture. High-context culture are a continuum of how explicit the messages exchanged in a culture are and how important the context in communication. High-context cultures often exhibit less-direct verbal and nonverbal communication, utilizing small communication gestures and reading more meaning into these less-direct messages.

=== Social Relations and Communication ===
In contrast to American communications where it's considered more low-context cultured and background information is needed, Korea's communication relies on cultural context derived from their customs and etiquettes. It's inevitable that differences in cultural perspectives will be channeled through communication; and if this communication is to be productive, interactions based on cultural knowledge and mutual respect will be needed. Asian languages, such as Korean, reflect its high-context culture with an abundance of implicitness.

Indirect communication is most likely to appeal to Korean citizens because they tend to value Confucianism which emphasizes harmony and egalitarianism. It reflected in their deeply rooted Confucian values and ideology which includes all participants in communication to save face if possible. If a stand is not taken, then people would not have to stick out among others, which is a form for threat in Confucian Korean cultures. Many of these high-culture context forms take place in the language itself such as their formality when using Korean honorifics, customs, and etiquette.

=== Customs and Etiquette in Korea ===
Although most aspects of etiquette are accepted by the country at large, customs can be localized to specific regions or influenced by other cultures, namely China, Japan, and the United States. Customs in Korea are derived from religions such as Korean Confucianism which is highly evident in the way that Koreans take care of others and their traditions. Most Koreans observe some forms of Confucian ceremonies such as Korean birthday celebrations and Korean New Year traditions, such as Seollal, even if they don't know of its Confucian value.

Furthermore, Korean etiquette, or the code of social behavior that governs human interactions, focuses on the core values of Korean Confucianism due to South Korea being an advocate of strict Confucian hierarchy and moral leadership. This determines how Korean citizens are expected to behave and uphold their responsibilities in their daily lives. Such important etiquette include avoiding making eye contact since it is considered it bad manners to look straight into another person's eyes while conversing. Thus, Koreans fix their gaze between the eyes and will often glance downwards. Failure to 'look somebody' in the eye does not mean 'a sign of weakness'. Instead, it will provide them with respect back from the person whether they are an elder, superior, or a stranger because it shows that a person is willing to give them the respect they deserve and not act inappropriately by "glaring" at them.

== World Heritage Sites ==
There are a number of designated UNESCO World Heritage Sites in Korea.

=== Jongmyo Shrine ===
The Jongmyo Shrine was added to the UNESCO World Heritage Site list in 1995 and is located in Seoul. The shrine is dedicated to the spirits of the ancestors of the royal family of the Joseon Dynasty. It is heavily influenced by Korean Confucian tradition. An elaborate performance of ancient court music (with accompanying dance) known as Jongmyo jeryeak is performed there each year.

When it was built in 1394 it was to be one of the longest buildings in Asia. There are 19 memorial tablets of kings and 30 of their queens, placed in 19 chambers. The shrine was burnt to the ground during the Imjin wars, but rebuilt in 1608.

=== Changdeokgung ===
Changdeokgung is also known as the "palace of illustrious virtue". It was built in 1405, burnt to the ground during the Imjin wars in 1592 and reconstructed in 1609. For more than 300 years Changdeokgung was the site of the royal seat. It is located in Seoul.

The surroundings and the palace itself are well matched. Some of the trees behind the palace are now over 300 years old, besides a preserved tree which is over 1000 years old. Changdeokgung was added to the UNESCO World Heritage list in 1997.

=== Bulguksa ===
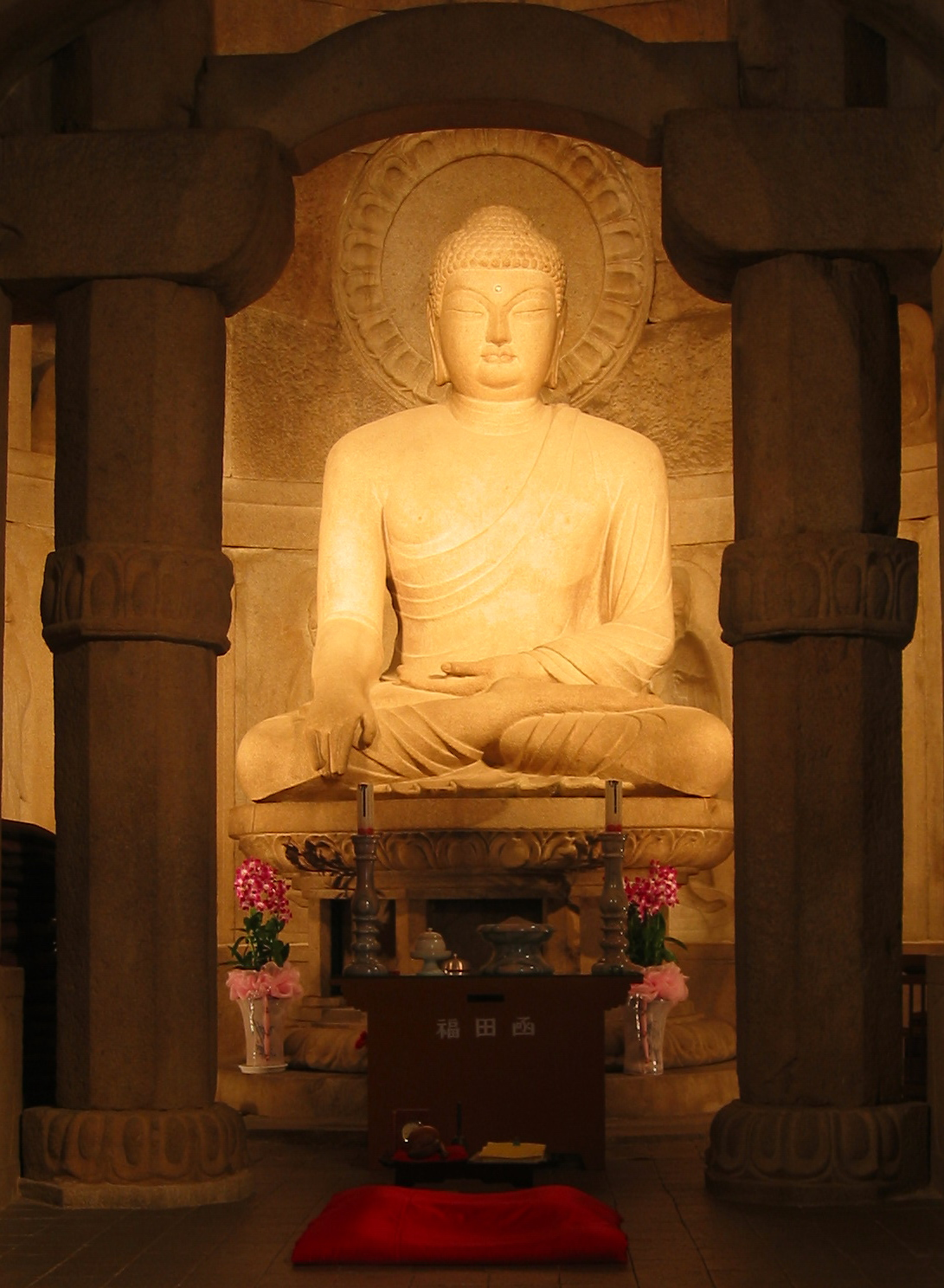
Seokguram Grotto

Bulguksa is also known as the temple of the Buddha Land and home of the Seokguram Grotto. The temple was constructed in 751 and consists of a great number of halls. There are two pagodas placed in the temple.

The Seokguram grotto is a hermitage of the Bulguksa temple. It is a granite sanctuary. In the main chamber a Buddha statue is seated. The temple and the grotto were added to the UNESCO World Heritage list in 1995.

=== Tripitaka Koreana and Haeinsa ===
Haeinsa is a large temple in South Gyeongsang Province. It was originally built in 802 and home to the Tripitaka Koreana wood blocks, the oldest Buddhist wooden manuscripts in the world. The carving of these wood blocks was initiated in 1236 and completed in 1251. The wood blocks are testimony to the pious devotion of king and his people.

The word Tripitaka is Sanskrit and stands for three baskets, referring to the Buddhist laws of aesthetics. The Tripitaka Koreana consists of 81'258 wood blocks and is the largest, oldest, and most complete collection of Buddhist scripts. Amazingly there is no trace of errata or omission on any of the wood blocks. The Tripitaka Koreana is widely considered as the most beautiful and accurate Buddhist canon carved in Hanja.

The site was added to the UNESCO World Heritage list in 1995.

=== Hwaseong ===
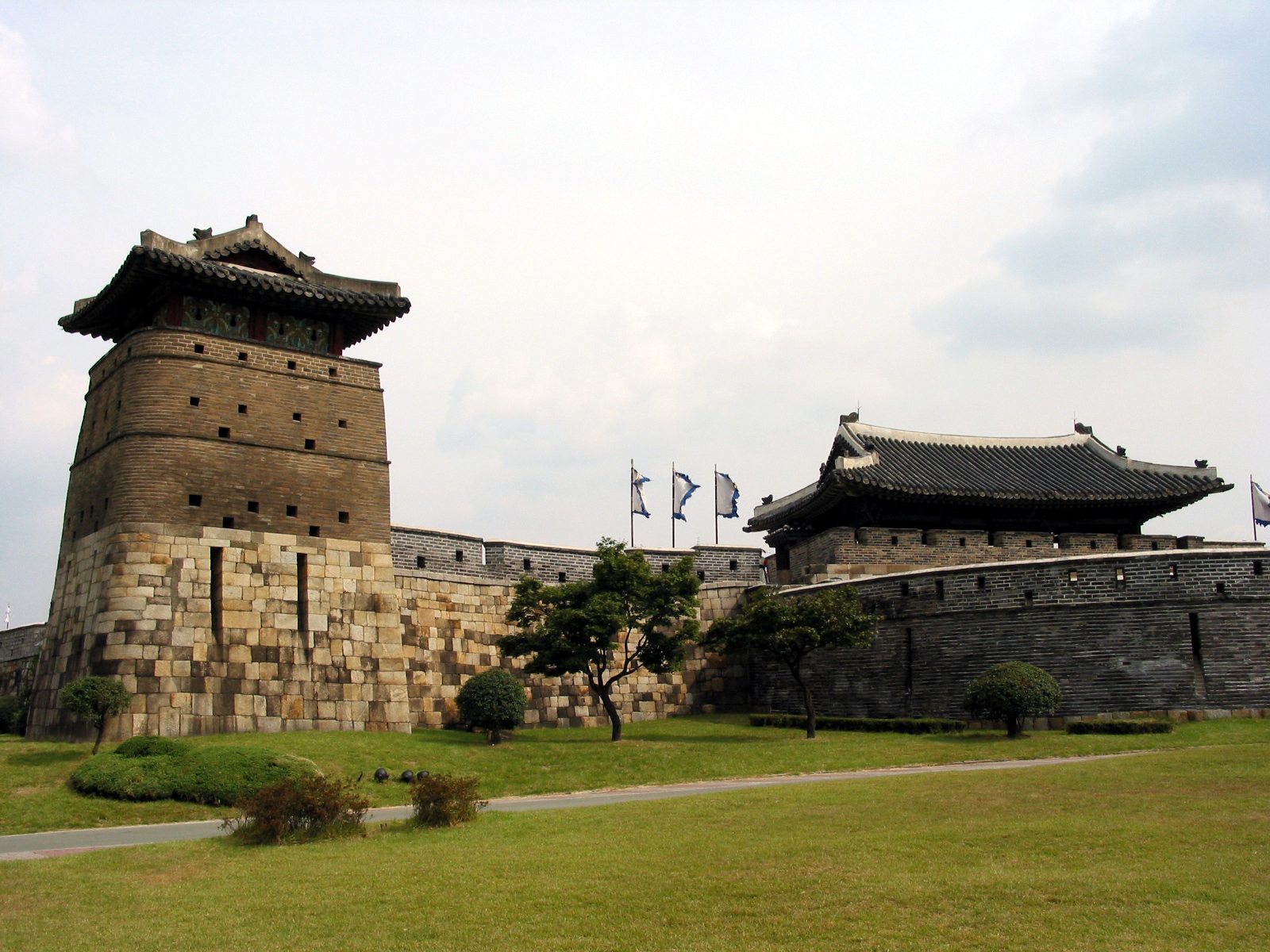
A frontal view of the west gate and watch tower

Hwaseong is the fortification of Suwon, South Korea. Its construction was completed in 1796 and it features all the latest features of Korean fortification known at the time. The fortress also contains a magnificent palace used for the King's visit to his father's tomb near the city.

The fortress covers both flat land and hilly terrain, something rarely seen in East Asia. The walls are 5.52 kilometres long and there are 41 extant facilities along the perimeter. These include four cardinal gates, a floodgate, four secret gates and a beacon tower.

Hwaseong was added to the UNESCO World Heritage list in 1997.

=== Namhansanseong ===
Namhansanseong became a UNESCO World Heritage Site in 2014.

=== Sansa, Buddhist Mountain Monasteries ===
The Sansa are Buddhist mountain monasteries located throughout the southern provinces of the Korean Peninsula. The spatial arrangement of the seven temples that comprise the property, established from the 7th to 9th centuries, present common characteristics that are specific to Korea – the 'madang' (open courtyard) flanked by four buildings (Buddha Hall, pavilion, lecture hall and dormitory). They contain a large number of individually remarkable structures, objects, documents and shrines. These mountain monasteries are sacred places, which have survived as living centres of faith and daily religious practice to the present.

=== Historic Monuments and Sites in Kaesong ===
The Historic Monuments and Sites in Kaesong became a UNESCO World Heritage Site in 2013.

=== Gochang, Hwasun and Ganghwa sites ===
The sites of Gochang, Hwasun and Ganghwa were added to the UNESCO list of World Heritage in 2000. These sites are home to prehistoric graveyards which contain hundreds of different megaliths. These megaliths are gravestones which were created in the 1st century B.C. out of large blocks of rock. Megaliths can be found around the globe, but nowhere in such a concentration as in the sites of Gochang, Hwasun and Ganghwa.

=== Gyeongju Area ===
The historic area around Gyeongju was added to the UNESCO list of World Heritage in 2000. Gyeongju was the capital of the Silla kingdom. The tombs of the Silla rulers can still be found in the centre of the city. These tombs took the shape of rock chambers buried in an earthen hill, sometimes likened with the pyramids. The area around Gyeongju, in particular on the Namsan mountain, is scattered with hundreds of remains from the Silla period. Poseokjeong is one of the most famous of these sites, but there is a great number of Korean Buddhist art, sculptures, reliefs, pagodas and remains of temples and palaces mostly built in the 7th and 10th century.

=== Complex of Koguryo Tombs ===
The Complex of Koguryo Tombs lies in Pyongyang, Pyong'an South Province, and Nampo City, South Hwanghae Province, North Korea. In July 2004 it became the first UNESCO World Heritage site north of the 38th parallel.

The site consists of 63 individual tombs from the later Goguryeo, one of the Three Kingdoms of Korea. It was founded around northern Korea and Manchuria around 32 BC, and the capital was moved to Pyongyang in 427. This kingdom dominated the region between the 5th and 7th century AD.

== See also ==
- Korean Wave
- Society of Joseon
- K-pop
- Korean birthday celebrations
- Science and technology in Korea
  - List of Korean inventions
- National Treasures of South Korea
- UNESCO World Heritage sites
- Traditional Korean thought
- East Asian age reckoning
- Marriage in South Korea
- Korean Buddhist sculpture
- Korean influence on Japanese culture
