= Ganju Lama =

Recipient of the Victoria Cross

Ganju Lama VC MM ADC
- Born: Gyamtso Shangderpa; 22 July 1924; Sangmo, Kingdom of Sikkim
- Died: 1 July 2000 (aged 75); Gangtok, Sikkim, India
- Military career
- Allegiance: British India; India
- Branch: British Indian Army; Indian Army
- Service years: 1942–1968
- Rank: Subedar Major
- Units: British India - 7th Gurkha Rifles; India - 11th Gorkha Rifles
- Conflicts: World War II; Burma campaign
- Awards: Victoria Cross; Military Medal

Subedar Major Gyamtso Shangdarpa, VC MM ADC (22 July 1924 – 1 July 2000) better known as Ganju Lama was born in the Kingdom of Sikkim on 22 July 1924 to Shangdarpa parents of the Bhutia Community. The etymology of the name "Ganju Lama" tells us that during the Chogyal period, sons of the Shangdarpa clan were expected to serve as monks. He enlisted in the British Indian Army in 1942 at the age of seventeen, as a rifleman in the 1st battalion, 7th Gurkha rifles. The Gurkha regiments were in dire need of manpower and would accept anyone who closely resembled a Gurkha. He is the only Bhutia recipient of the Victoria Cross, the highest and most prestigious award for gallantry in the face of the enemy that can be awarded to British and Commonwealth forces.

== Enlistment ==
Ganju Lama was born in Sangmo, southern Sikkim, India, on 22 July 1924. He enlisted in the Army in 1942 at the age of seventeen. His parents were both of Sikkimese Bhutia descent and lived in Sikkim, which made him unusual, as he was neither an ethnic Gurkha nor a Nepalese subject. At that time, however, Gurkha regiments were prepared to accept any recruit who closely resembled a Gurkha and lived near the border of Nepal. Ganju Lama's tribe lived in the kingdom of Sikkim. His name was Gyamtso Shangderpa, but a clerk in the recruiting office wrote it down as "Ganju", and the name stuck. After leaving the regimental depot in 1943, he joined the 1st Battalion, 7th Gurkha Rifles, near Imphal.

== Victoria Cross ==
Ganju Lama was nineteen years old, and a rifleman in the 1st Battalion, 7th Gurkha Rifles, in the Indian Army during World War II.

On 12 June 1944, near Ningthoukhong, India, 'B' Company was attempting to stem the enemy's advance when it came under heavy machine-gun and tank machine-gun fire. Ganju Lama, "on his own initiative with great attitude & coolness and complete disregard for his own safety", took his PIAT anti-tank weapon and crawled forward. Despite a broken wrist and two other serious wounds to his right leg and left hand he then moved forward, succeeded in bringing the weapon into action within 30 yards of the enemy tanks, knocking out two of them (a third was taken out by an anti-tank gun). He continued forward and used grenades on the tank crews who were trying to escape. Not until he "had killed or wounded them all did he allow himself to be taken back to the Regimental Aid Post" to have his wounds dressed.

A month earlier, during operations on the Tiddim Road, Ganju Lama's regiment had surprised a party of Japanese and killed several of them. He was awarded the Military Medal for his part in that action. This award was announced in the London Gazette after his Victoria Cross, appearing on 3 October 1944, almost a month later.

== Later life ==
After India gained its independence, he joined the Indian 11th Gorkha Rifles, retiring in 1968, to become a farmer in Sikkim. He was appointed honorary ADC to the President of India for life. He died at Gangtok following a battle with cancer on 1 July 2000, aged 75.

His Victoria Cross is displayed at The Gurkha Museum in Winchester, England along with those of other Gurkhas.

A memorial in his memory (Ganju Lama War Museum) has been constructed at Sherathang in East Sikkim district of Sikkim.

== See also ==
- List of Brigade of Gurkhas recipients of the Victoria Cross
