= Sogo (disambiguation) =

Sogo is a department store chain that operates an extensive network of branches, primarily in Japan.

Sogo may also refer to:

== Companies and organizations ==
- Hotel Sogo, a hotel chain in the Philippines
- NHK General TV, known as NHK Sōgō in Japanese
- Pacific Sogo, a department store chain in Taiwan and mainland China
- SOGo, an open source collaborative software server
- Sogo Hong Kong, department stores in Hong Kong and China
- Sogo & Seibu, a Japanese retail company
- Sogo shosha, Japanese general trading companies
- Sogou, traded on the NYSE as SOGO, an internet company in China

== People ==
- Shinji Sogō (1884–1981), president of Japanese National Railways
- Sōgo Ishii (born 1957), Japanese film director
- Sogō Kazumasa (1532–1561), Japanese samurai
- Sogō Masayasu (1554–1587) Japanese samurai of the Sengoku period
- Sogo Watanabe (born 1990) Japanese volleyball player

== Other uses ==
- Sogo, a fictional city in Barbarella (comics)
- Sogo, a small Korean hand drum
