= Sangmo =

Traditional Korean hat for folk art

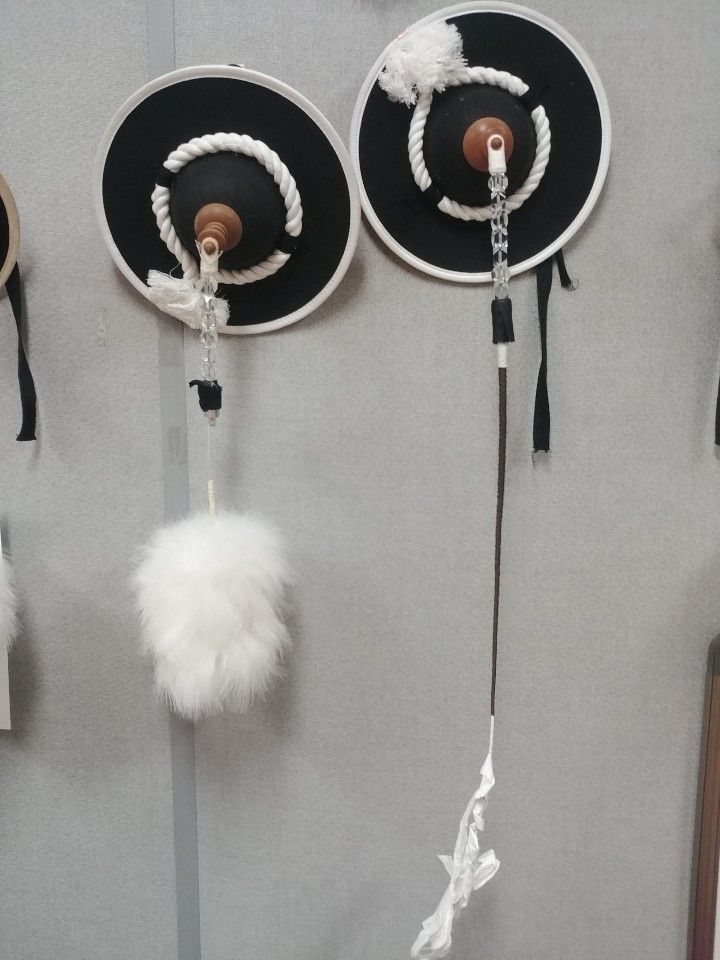
Sangmo, Hanyang University, ERICA Campus College of Communication Pungmul Club

A sangmo (Korean: 상모) is a hat used for Korean folk performances. It has feathers or paper streamers called piji, made of Korean paper attached to the top which is worn when dancing and moving the head around (머리춤; lit. head dance) during a pungmul (nongak) performance.

== Terms ==
The hat is also called chae-sang or beop-go. Performances with it are also called sangmo-noleum, chaesang-noleum, buckgu-noleum. Noleum (놀음) means performance. A person who wears a sangmo is called a beok-gu (벅구), chaesang-chibae (채상치배), or beokgu-jaebi (버꾸잽이). Chibae (치배) and jaebi (잽이) are terms for percussionists in pungmul.

== Origin ==
The origin of it can be found in the history of the jeon-lip. Jeonp-lip is a black cap of the sangmo. The origin of the jeon-lip is the jeolpung on the head. Jeolpung is the basic type of crown cap of the Three Kingdoms period, and used various ornaments such as flowers, branches, and bird feathers to represent the region and its identity.

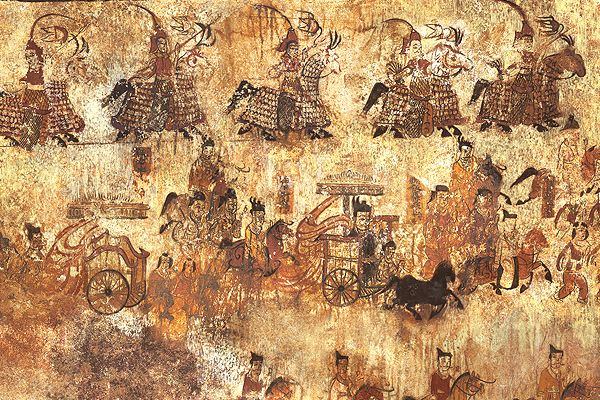
Dokheung-ri ancient tomb mural painting

The old style of sangmo can be found in the mural paintings of Goguryeo tombs which adorn the feathers of birds on soldiers' heads.

There are also claims that the sangmo was used as a means of military command. As the commander nodded left, right, rear, front, and all directions, the military stretched to the great heights of 'ㅡ,' 'ㅁ,' '曲, and 'ㅇ.' Scholars say that it has gradually changed from military culture to an entertainment.

== Composition ==
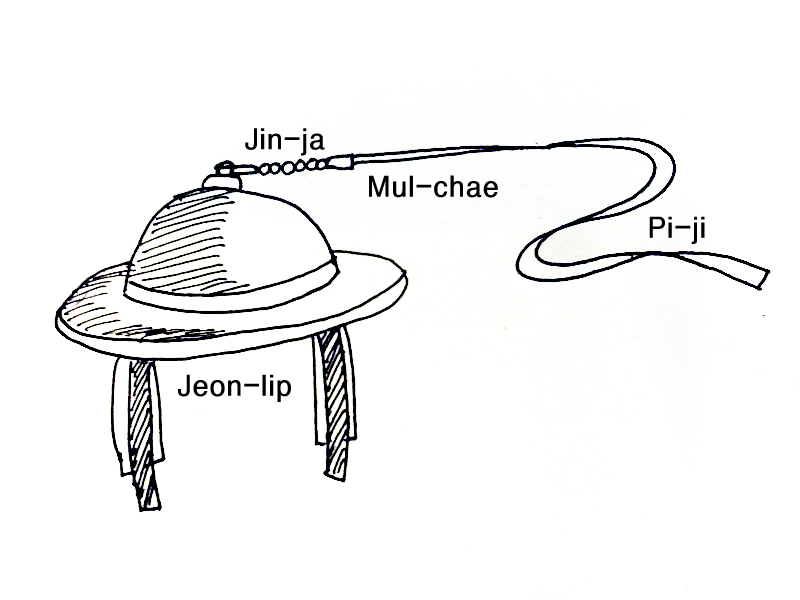
Structure of sangmo

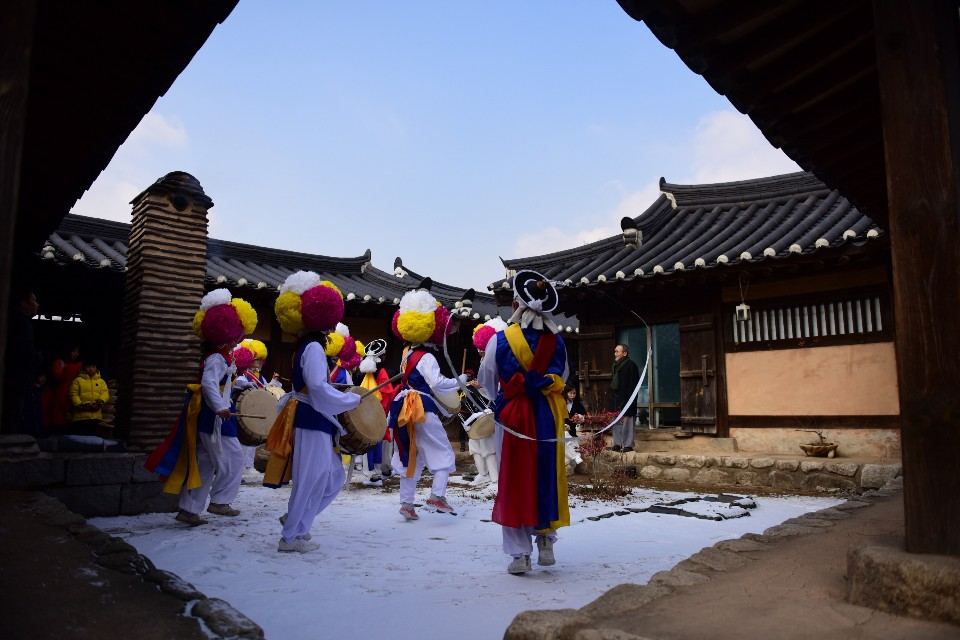
2018, South Korea, DaeYami

The composition of the sangmo is divided into two parts: the leader session (kkwaenggwari) and instrument session (sogo: A small hand-held drum). Sangmo can be divided into jeon-lip corresponding to a hat, jin-ja made of wood and plastic beads, and mul-chae made of white thread and animal feathers.

- Chae-sangmo: At the end of mulchae, a long Korean paper called pi-ji.
- Ppot-sangmo: Put on bunch of crane or ostrich feathers. It is usually used by a kwaenggwari performer.
- Dog tail-sangmo: Gather the feathers of a bird like a round ball and put it together. Its shape is said to resemble a dog's tail.
- Yoldubal-sangmo: Yoldu means '12'. Put a 180 cm-long pi-ji on it. make a showy move that is close to a stunt.

== Performance type ==
- Oe-sa (외사): It means one-sided motion. It is a technique to turn the jin-ja in one direction. Turn anti-clockwise from the position of a performer (chi-bae). External force is the action of drawing a circle with feathers or paper.
- Sa-sa (사사): It is also called yangsa. It means two-sided motion. It is a technique that turns the jin-ja twice. performer (chi-bae) looks first from the left and turns.
- Butterfly-sa (나비사): It was named because it resembled a butterfly. While doing 'sa-sa', performer raises head from the fourth beat and shoots a vertex.
