= Pungmul as protest =

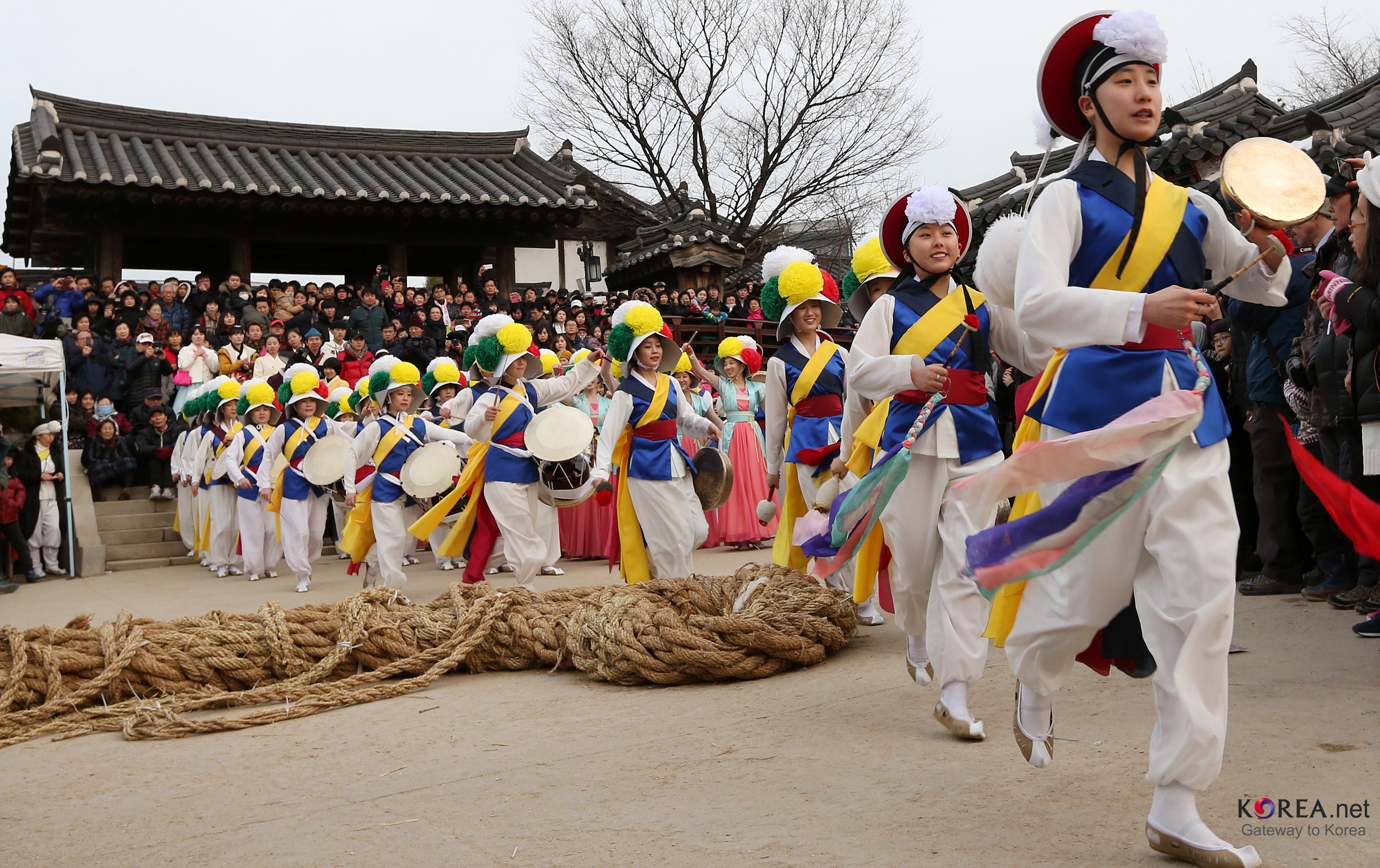
Korean pungmul players at Daeboreum, the first full moon of the new lunar year, when jishinbalbki happens.

Pungmul (Korean: 풍물; Hanja: 風物; also spelled "poongmul") is a Korean folk musical art that has a long history of being used for tradition, community formation, ritual, and expression. Its roots are deeply tied to Korean pre-industrial farming culture. Although pungmul was used in earlier protests, it became widely acknowledged as a method of protest during South Korea's pro-democracy movement in the 1970s. Through the minjung movement that spurred the struggle for democratization and labor rights, pungmul's regular presence at protests signifies a "sonic marker of dissent" and continues to be an active part of contemporary protest culture in South Korea and beyond.

== In South Korea ==
=== Origin in the Minjung Movement ===
Pungmul, along with other Korean folk arts such as talchum, madang guk, and minyo were important in the minjung movement. The minjung movement was a movement of the people during the 1970s and 1980s, led by workers and university students which focused on the will of the common people and advocated for democratization. It involved a will of the university students and intellectual elites to become and embody the working class, which in the minjung movement was seen as the "ultimate revolutionary subject". Performing and remembering the folk cultural arts that originated from peasant culture was a way to perform minjung and protest in the rapidly industrializing era within South Korea at the time.

Although pungmul was slower to be considered political than other genres during the minjung movement due to its lack of script and lyrics, students used pungmul during street protests and demonstration, often shouting slogans such as "Revolution!" and "Down with the dictatorship!" along the beats while in violent altercations with police. Other than the sentiment of performing minjung ideology, pungmul was useful in protests due to its loud volume, as it was easily heard over a long distance and in the presence of large crowds and energized the group. Historically, pungmul was used by farmers to set a working rhythm and create a sense of community. This nature of the art, with basic beats easy to learn and the ability to be strapped onto the player for mobility, also made it accessible to protests.

=== Feminist movement within pungmul ===
Pungmul was not only a tool to be used in protest, it also provided space for protest within its community. Pungmul was a male-exclusive art when it first emerged. While men performed it for public events and labor efficiency, only the lowest class women such as shamans and kisaengs were considered to play it, due in part to the strong Confucian ideologies in South Korea at the time. In the 1950s to 1970s the first women pungmul groups called yeseong nongakdan emerged, but were still denied the right to play at public events and its performers were considered lower class. Because they were excluded from playing the traditional village ritual performance pieces, they were also free to create entirely new repertoires that explored a more "feminine" performance style with fluid dances and heavy makeup. As the traditional labor performances became more rare and the minjung movement allowed pungmul to be played in less traditional contexts, women were able to use pungmul to emerge into the professional music world.

=== Contemporary protests ===
Pungmul continues to be regularly used in political protest today. Queer festivals in South Korea, pro-labor rights protests, and feminist protests all regularly feature pungmul. Pungmul is also a prominent feature in re-enactments of historical protest events, such as the Gwangju Uprising and the March 1st movement.

It is also seen in conservative protests. Pungmul and the use of pungmul instruments has also been seen in recent years at Korean Christian anti-queer demonstrations.

== In the United States ==
Pungmul groups were first formed in the United States by politically-minded Korean American activists, and Korean political refugees that had participated in the minjung movement in Korea. Groups formed mainly in major cities like Los Angeles, Chicago, New York, and the Bay Area including San Francisco, Berkeley, and Oakland between 1985 and 1989. They mostly formed as branches of a larger Korean organization, in college campuses, and in special interest groups. The Korean diaspora uses pungmul and other such expressive folk practices to create stronger cultural bonds and engage in cultural activism in the United States. For example, college pungmul groups regularly participate in Korean American or Asian American culture night performances in their respective campuses, and Jishinbalbki Korean: 지신밟기; Hanja: 地神--)s--rituals to ward off evil spirits—in their local Koreatowns.

Pungmul is also used in liberal and progressive protest actions by political organizations with pungmul branches in the United States, as it is in South Korea.
