= Gangneung nongak =

Musical tradition in South Korea

Gangneung nongak is the nongak musical tradition in Gangneung, Gangwon Province, South Korea. It was designated as an important intangible cultural property in 1985.

It is a representative nongak with the characteristics of nongak in the east of the Taebaek Mountains in Gangwon-do. In the Gangneung area, various nongak such as Dapgyo Nongak during the Lunar New Year's Day, Geogung Nongak at the beginning of the year, and Gimjeok (dure) Nongak were handed down. Since 1961, it has been widely known as an important intangible cultural asset since it has appeared and won several national folk competitions, and as of 1998, Park Ki-ha (Sangsoe) and Kim Yong-hyun (泫) have been designated as holders of the entertainment industry.

== Nongak organization ==
Nongak organization consists of Nong Ki-su, Block Lead, Chamber of Commerce and Industry (Sangsoe), Bu-soe, Samssoe, Collection, Janggo-su, Daebuk-su, Sogo-su, Beopgo-su, and Mudong-dong (Joongae).

== Description ==
In principle, the iron jab and Beopgo-su wear a bucket hat, and the rest of them wear a cone hat, but now only Mudong uses a cone hat. The jab has a colored band, and the Mudong wears a red skirt, a green jeogori and a navy blue jugori. There are three types of iron music, such as Ilchae (Cheondang-unfair), Samchae, Gutgeori, Gilgunakchilchae, and Gilnongi Garak, but these days, it is rare to play Gilgunakchil, and there is a new Gilnori Garak. Pangut includes mungseok Roll, Hwangdeok Exorcism, Hwangdeok Exorcism Mudongnori, Hwangdeok Exorcism Go Nori, Jin Nori, Farming Pool, Dandong Gori, Samdong Gori, Beopgo Dance, and twelve-legged sangmo. These days, it is rare to stand in a donggori, and instead, there are many farming pools. Farming pool is performed with various farming movements as dances. Gangneung Nongak is different from other Nongak in that Beopgo and Sogo are distinguished, and a lot of Mudongs are organized. The dances of Beopgo, Sogo, and Mudong dominate the pangut. Because of its simple and very fast, it is considered the fastest Nongak in the country, and because most of the dances are run, it is very strong and lively, but there is no laid-back charm.
