= 7th Duke of Edinburgh's Own Gurkha Rifles =

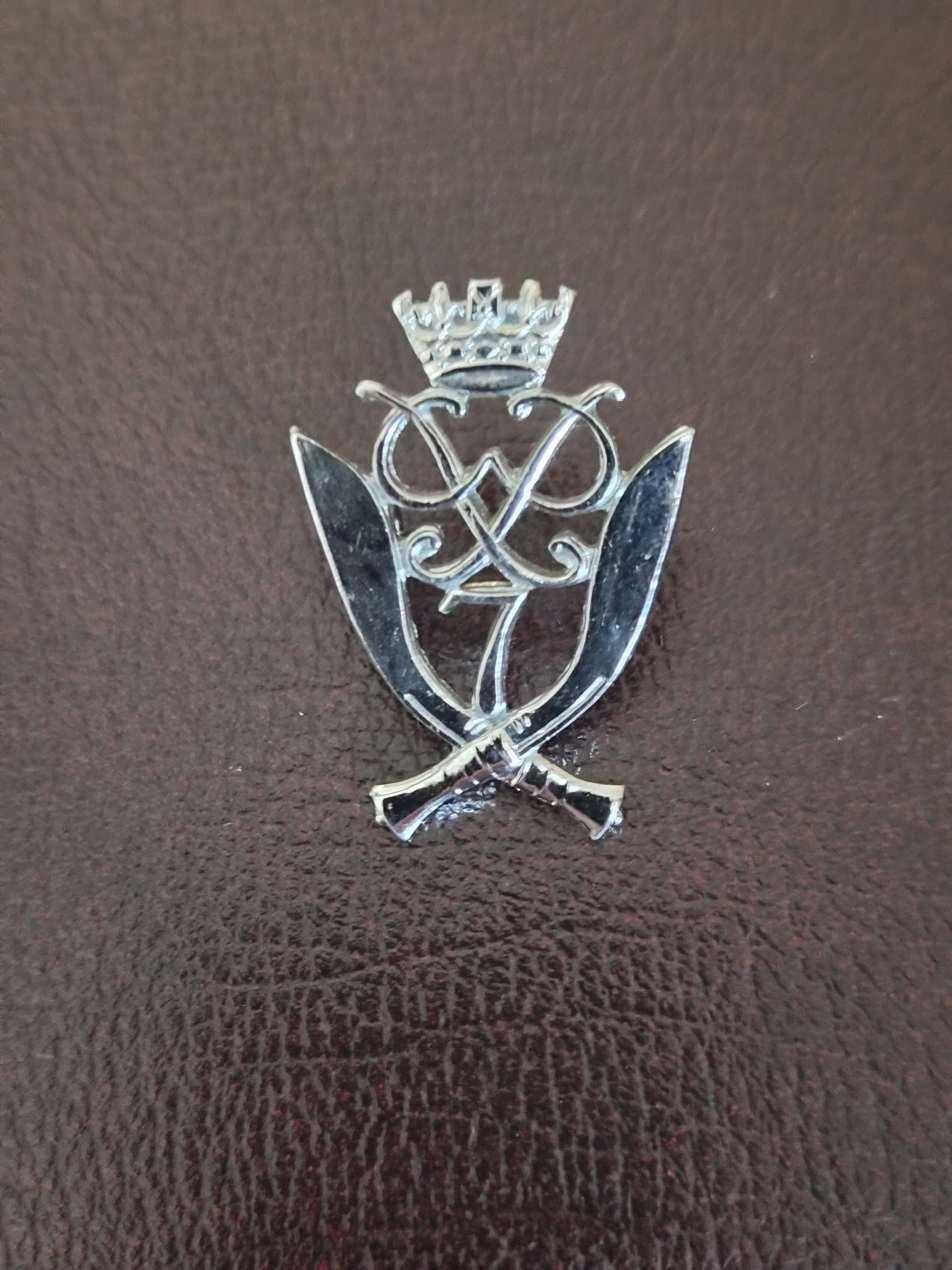
- 7th DEO Gurkha Rifles cap badge
- Active: 1902–1994
- Country: India; United Kingdom
- Branch: British Army
- Type: Rifles
- Role: Light Infantry
- Colours: Rifle Green; Facings Black
- March: Old Monmouthshire (Military Band); All the Blue Bonnets are over the Border (Pipes and Drums)
- Engagements: World War I Mesopotamia, The Middle East; Third Afghan War; World War II; North Africa, Italy, Greece, Burma; Malayan Emergency; Indonesian Confrontation; Falkland Islands (1982)

Insignia
- Shoulder Flash
- Abbreviation: 7 GR

The 7th Gurkha Rifles was a rifle regiment of the British Indian Army, before being transferred to the British Army, following India's independence in 1947 and after 1959 designated as the 7th Duke of Edinburgh's Own Gurkha Rifles.

== History ==
=== Formation ===
Raised at Thayetmyo in Burma in 1902 by Major G. E. Vansittart as the 8th Gurkha Rifles; became the 2nd Battalion, 10th Gurkha Rifles, 1903 and then 7th Gurkha Rifles in 1907. The 2nd Battalion was raised at Quetta in 1907 by Major N. G. Woodyatt, the Right Wing becoming the 1st Battalion and the Left Wing becoming the 2nd Battalion 7th Gurkha Rifles.

=== First World War ===
The regiment's first home base was designated as Quetta in northwest India, now Pakistan. It was from here that the 2nd Battalion (2/7 GR) deployed at the start of the First World War to join British forces which were to fight against the Ottoman Empire in the Middle East. The battalion's first campaign in Mesopotamia, modern day Iraq, was ill-fated. In spite of early successes, such as the battles at Nasiriyah and Ctesiphon, it was part of the force which became trapped at Kut-al-Amara on the River Tigris. The Siege of Kut resulted in the defeat of the garrison who surrendered to the Turkish Army in 1916. However, in the following year a new 2nd Battalion was raised and the 1st Battalion which had now arrived from Nepal joined it in a reinvigorated and victorious campaign which swept the Turks out of Mesopotamia.

=== Interwar years ===
Following the end of the war, the 1st Battalion saw service in the brief Kurdistan campaign, while the 2nd Battalion returned to India to fight in the Third Afghan War, alongside the 3rd Battalion raised for war service in 1917. Thereafter, the two regular battalions spent the inter-war years on occasional tours of duty on the northwest frontier of India and on internal security tasks elsewhere on the sub continent. The 2nd Battalion played a notable part in rescue operations following the disastrous earthquake which destroyed much of Quetta in 1935.

=== Second World War ===
At the time of the outbreak of the Second World War, both Battalions were based alongside each other at Shillong in the Indian province of Assam. 2nd Battalion was mobilised for overseas operations in 1941, returning to Iraq to participate in the campaign to secure oil supplies for the Allies and then to defeat Vichy French forces in Syria. It then redeployed to join the 8th Army in North Africa where it had the misfortune to be captured at Tobruk in 1942 along with the rest of the garrison. In the meantime the 1st Battalion together with a hastily raised 3rd Battalion had joined British forces fighting a Japanese army which had invaded Burma. Despite heavy casualties during the retreat to India both battalions survived the ordeal. 1/7 GR re-armed and retrained, then took part in the great defensive battle at Imphal in 1944 which broke the Japanese advance. The gallantry displayed by a young rifleman, Ganju Lama, during a subsequent action near Bishenpur was recognised by the award of the Victoria Cross. The 1st Battalion then took part in the great campaign waged by 14th Army under the command of General Sir William Slim, who as a Lt Colonel had earlier commanded the 2nd Battalion in India, to re-conquer Burma and played the foremost part in the capture of Meiktila. The 3rd Battalion which had been redesigned as a parachute unit took part in the airborne assault to liberate Rangoon. As these events unfolded in the south east Asia, a new 2nd Battalion was again created in time to rejoin 8th Army in Italy. It took part in the monumental battle at Monte Cassino and was one of the very few battalions ever to earn a Battle Honour on its own, 'Tavoleto' for seizing the hilltop town of that name in the Marche. The Battalion completed its wartime service in Greece as part of the British force sent to stabilise the country following the end of German occupation.

=== Post War and Indian Independence ===
For the 7th Gurkhas the coming of world peace was a time to disband both the 3rd Battalion and the 4th Battalion, raised in 1941 for frontier protection and internal security. The years after 1945 saw all Gurkha regiments preoccupied with the issue of Indian independence and the conditions of near civil war attendant on the partition of India and the creation of Pakistan. By an agreement between the Kingdom of Nepal and the British and Indian governments, four Gurkha regiments including the 7th Gurkhas were transferred to British Army service on 1 January 1948 in which they were to form the British Brigade of Gurkhas. However, because a significant number of its manpower chose not to follow the regiment into British service; the 3rd Battalion was transferred to the 5th Royal Gurkha Rifles (Frontier Force), while a large number of men formed the nucleus of the new 11th Gurkha Rifles, now both regiments of the Indian Army. The regiment moved almost immediately to Malaya which was to be the main Gurkha base for the next 25 years.

=== The Malayan Emergency ===
There, in 1948 as part of a plan to create an all-arms Gurkha division, the two battalions began training to become field artillery regiments, forming the 101st and 102nd Field Regiments, Royal Artillery. They stayed in the artillery role for only a year, before reverting to infantry in 1949. The experiment was short-lived because almost at once the regiment was committed to the campaign against communist insurgents which came to be known as the Malayan Emergency and reverted to its infantry role. For some twelve years the two battalions conducted jungle operations against an often elusive foe. The 2nd Battalion enjoyed a tour of duty as part of Britain's Hong Kong garrison from 1959 to 1961. The campaign has been judged by posterity to have been a great success. Although no Battle Honour was awarded, the approval of a Royal title for the regiment in 1959 in honour of the Duke of Edinburgh was a signal recognition of its outstanding operational record in Malaya and an acknowledgement of its distinguished service in the two world wars. From now on the regiment was to be styled, '7th Duke of Edinburgh's Own Gurkha Rifles'.

=== The Brunei Revolt and the Borneo Confrontation ===
In 1962 the 1st Battalion was dispatched from Malaya to the nearby state of Brunei in north Borneo to assist the British Army in suppressing a revolt by Indonesian backed rebels against the Sultan, an ally of the United Kingdom. A short time later they were joined by the 2nd Battalion and each conducted successful operations resulting in the capture of some of the key leaders of the rebellion. Operations in Brunei prompted recognition of the need for a parachute force to be available in the Far East and the regiment contributed the majority of the complement which established the Gurkha Independent Parachute Company in 1963. The Brunei Revolt was a prelude to a war between an expansionist Indonesia and the new Malaysian Federation backed by Britain and the Commonwealth which is known as the Borneo Confrontation. Fought largely in the mountains and swamps of Sabah and Sarawak and without much publicity it lasted from 1963 to 1966. Both Battalions of 7 GR were heavily involved in the campaign in which the reputation of Gurkhas as supremely able jungle soldiers was enhanced.

=== Hong Kong, UK and Brunei tours ===
The victorious conclusion of the campaign and the establishment of political stability in that corner of south east Asia presaged a re evaluation of Britain's role in the Far East. Although the regiment was increasingly involved in maintaining the security of the Crown Colony of Hong Kong, particularly when stability there was affected by the Chinese Cultural revolution in 1967, the strength of Brigade was to be substantially reduced. On 31 July 1970 the two Battalions amalgamated into one. The new Battalion moved to the United Kingdom in 1971 to Queen Elizabeth Barracks, Church Crookham near Fleet in Hampshire. On this first tour the regiment had the great honour of being the first Gurkha regiment to mount the guard at Buckingham Palace. Thereafter, 7 GR proceeded on a cycle of duty tours alternating between the United Kingdom, Brunei and Hong Kong, taking part in training exercises around the world, maintaining its jungle skills and providing internal and border security in Hong Kong. In 1981 the 2nd Battalion was re-raised to assist the Hong Kong government cope with the surge in immigration from China. The 2nd Battalion was disbanded in 1987 when the crisis had passed.

=== The Falklands and the final years ===
The routine of peacetime was briefly broken in 1982 when 1st/7th Gurkhas, then based in the United Kingdom, deployed with 5th Infantry Brigade, subsequently 5th Airborne Brigade, as part of the task force which successfully recaptured the Falkland Islands following the Argentine invasion, its primary action being at Mount William thereby earning its final Battle Honour. The Battalion was once again in the United Kingdom from 1991 for what would be its final years, until it was amalgamated in 1994 with both battalions of 2nd King Edward VII's Own Gurkha Rifles (The Sirmoor Rifles), 6th Queen Elizabeth's Own Gurkha Rifles, and 10th Princess Mary's Own Gurkha Rifles to form the Royal Gurkha Rifles.

== Lineage ==
- 1902: 8th Gurkha Rifles
- 1903–1907: 2nd Battalion 10th Gurkha Rifles
- 1907–1959: 7th Gurkha Rifles
- 1959–1994: 7th Duke of Edinburgh's Own Gurkha Rifles

== Battle honours ==
- The Great War: Suez Canal, Egypt 1915, Megiddo, Sharon, Palestine 1918, Shaiba, Kut al Amara 1915 '17, Ctesiphon, Defence of Kut al Amara, Baghdad, Sharqat, Mesopotamia 1915-18
- Afghanistan 1919
- The Second World War: Tobruk 1942, North Africa 1942, Cassino I, Campriano, Poggio del Grillo, Tavoleto, Montebello-Scorticata Ridge, Italy 1944, Sittang 1942 '45, Pegu 1942, Kyaukse 1942, Shwegyin, Imphal, Bishenpur, Meiktila, Capture of Meiktila, Defence of Meiktila, Rangoon Road, Pyawbwe, Burma 1942-45
- Falkland Islands 1982

== Victoria Cross ==
- Rifleman Ganju Lama VC MM of the 1st Battalion, Ningthoukhong, Burma, Second World War (1944).

== Colonels of the regiment ==
Colonels of the regiment were:

- Field Marshal The Earl Kitchener of Khartoum KG KP GCB OM GCSI GCMG GCIE PC
- Major General Nigel Gresley Woodyatt CB CIE
- Major General J H F Lakin CB CSI
- 1944–1956: Field Marshal The Viscount Slim of Burma KG GCB GCMG GCVO GBE DSO MC KStJ

7th Gurkha Rifles, The Gurkha Regiment (1948)

- 1956–1964: Field Marshal Sir Gerald Templer KG GCB GCMG KBE DSO

7th Duke of Edinburgh's Own Gurkha Rifles (1959)

- 1964–1975: General Sir Walter Walker KCB CBE DSO and two bars
- 1975–1982: Brigadier Eric David Smith CBE DSO
- 1982–1991: Brigadier John Whitehead MBE
- 1991–1994: Brigadier Sir Miles Hunt-Davis GCVO CBE
- 1994: Regiment amalgamated to form The Royal Gurkha Rifles.

== See also ==
- The Gurkha Museum
- Gurkha Welfare Trust
- List of Brigade of Gurkhas recipients of the Victoria Cross

== Sources ==
- Mackay, Colonel J. N. (1962). The History of the 7th Duke of Edinburgh's Own Gurkha Rifles 1902–1948. Vol. I. Edinburgh and London: William Blackwood & Sons Ltd.
- Smith, Brigadier E. D. (1976). East of Kathmandu – The Story of the 7th Duke of Edinburgh's Own Gurkha Rifles 1948–1973. Vol. II. London: Leo Cooper.
- Smith, Brigadier E. D. (1997). The Autumn Years – The Story of the 7th Duke of Edinburgh's Own Gurkha Rifles 1973–1994. Vol. III. Staplehurst: Spellmount.
