= Pyeongtaek nongak =

Traditional farmers' music in Korea

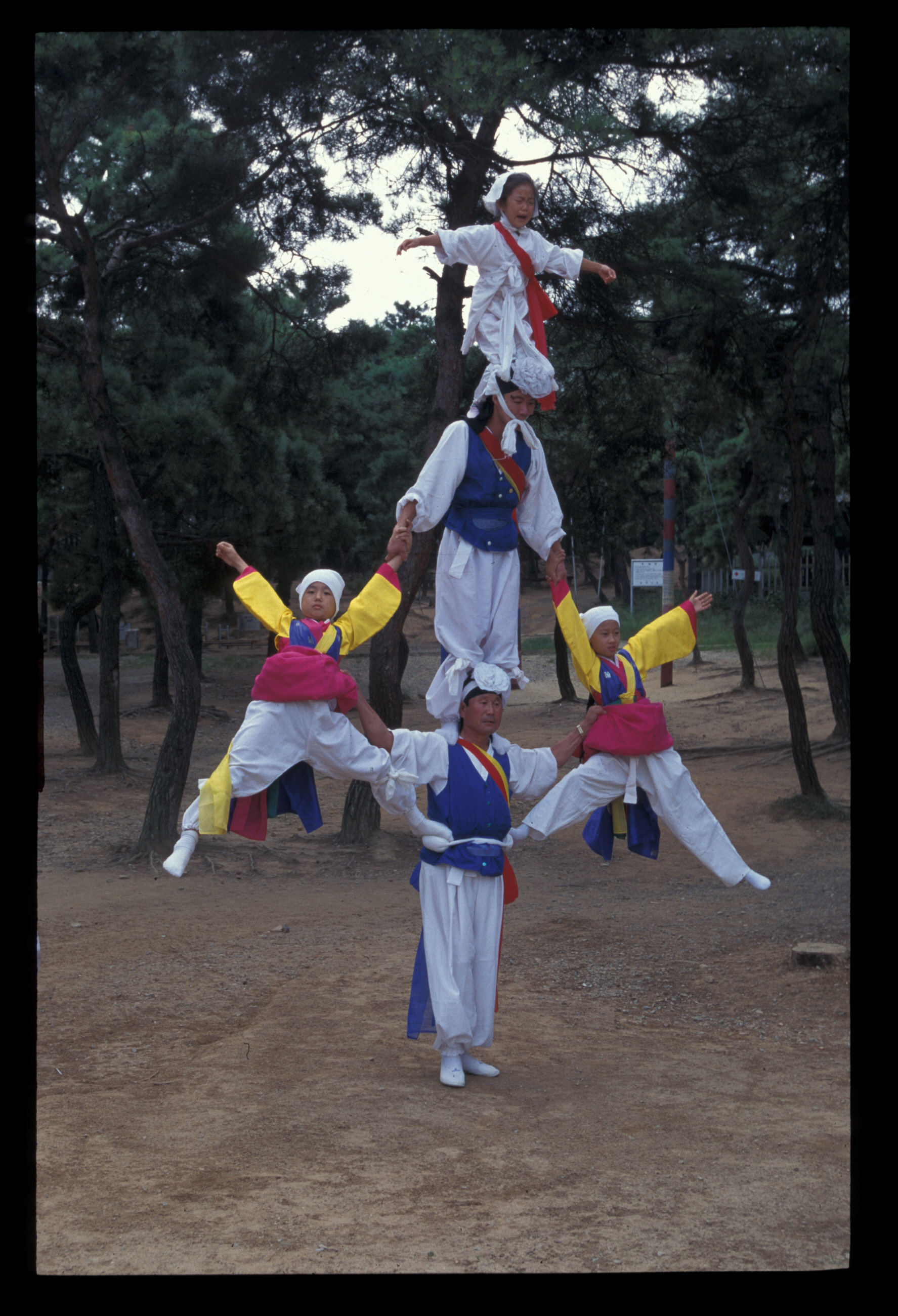
- Performance (1996)

Korean name
- Hangul: 평택농악
- Hanja: 平澤農樂
- Revised Romanization: Pyeongtaek nongak
- McCune–Reischauer: P'yongtaek nongak

Pyeongtaek nongak (Korean: 평택농악) refers to nongak, or Korean farmer's music, that has been performed and handed down in the Pyeongtaek region of Gyeonggi Province.

There are five types of nongak in Korea: Wootdari (웃다리) nongak of Gyeonggi and Chungcheong, Left Jeolla nongak, Right Jeolla nongak, Southeastern Korea (Yeongnam) nongak, and Eastern Gangwon-do (Yeongdong) nongak. Each nongak has its unique representation of Korean culture and has been recognized as an important intangible cultural asset in each region.

It was designated as the eleventh asset of the Important Intangible Cultural Property by the South Korean government on December 1, 1985. Since then, there have been many performances in and out of South Korea.

== Origins ==
Pyeongtaek has had open fields called Sosabeol, 소사벌 and traditionally its people have farmed. This was a crucial background for developing Pyeongtaek nongak. In Gyeonggi and Chungcheong provinces, there were many professional performing groups and Geollippaes (걸립패) which were performing nongak groups (though sometimes monk groups) asking for money and food while entertaining village people. Cheongyongsa Temple near Pyeongtaek was a base for the troupes of strolling player (Namsadang, 남사당패) at the end of the Joseon dynasty.

== See also ==
- Pungmul
- Namsadang
- Samul nori
- Traditional music of Korea
