= Daeya-dong, Gunpo =

Coordinates: 37°20′N 126°54′E

- Hangul: 대야동
- Hanja: 大夜洞
- RR: Daeya-dong
- MR: Taeya-dong

Daeya-dong (Korean: 대야동) is neighbourhood of Gunpo, Gyeonggi Province, South Korea.
