= Sogo (instrument) =

Traditional Korean drum

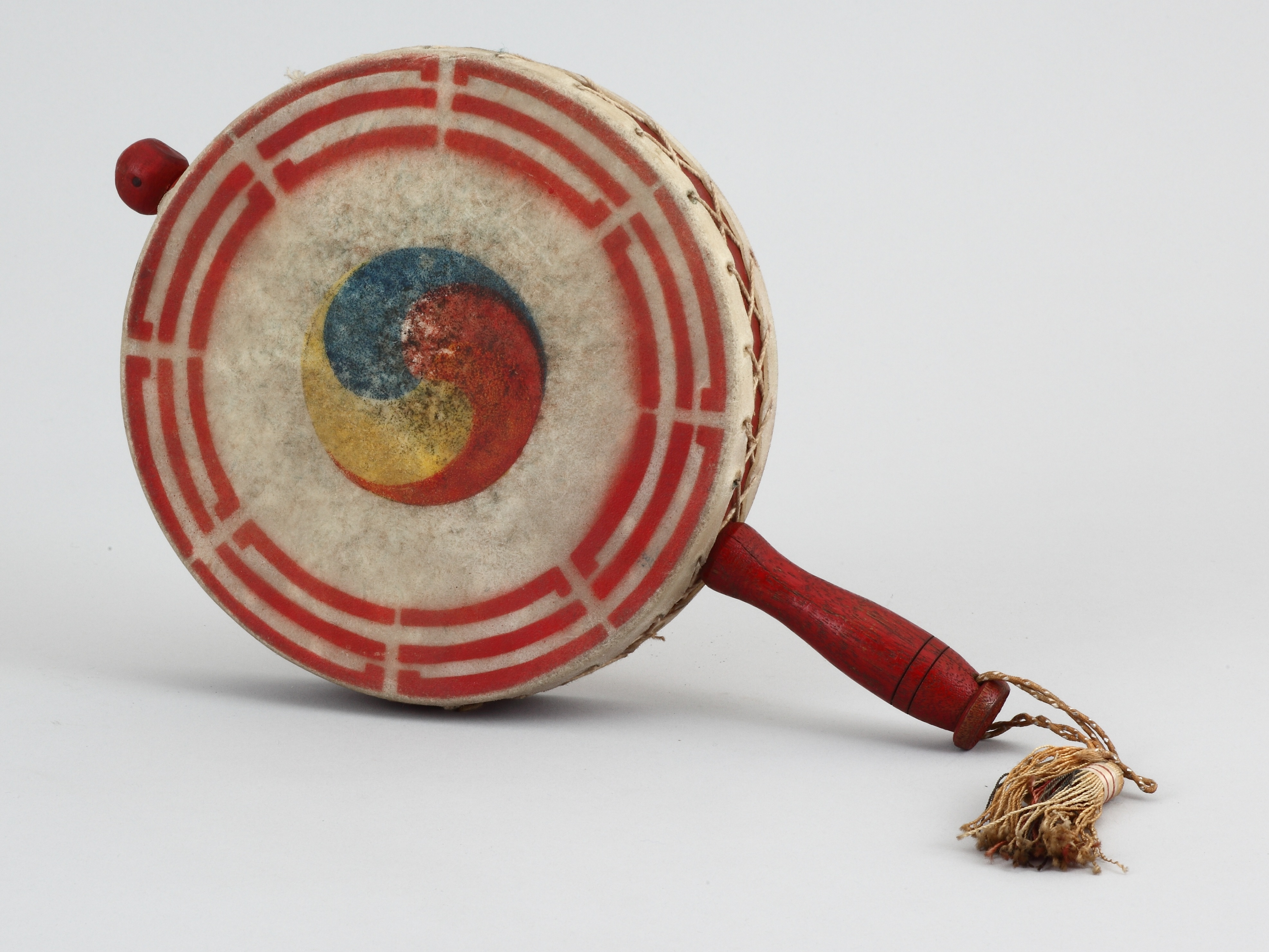
- A sogo with a taegeuk painted onto it

Korean name
- Hangul: 소고
- Hanja: 小鼓
- RR: sogo
- MR: sogo

The sogo (Korean: 소고; Hanja: 小鼓) is a traditional Korean percussion instrument made by hitting a wooden stick with leather on both sides. It is also called beopgo (법고) or beokgu (벅구). It is one of the required instruments in elementary schools of South Korea.

== Overview ==
Sogo are made by placing leather on both sides of a round drum body that is about 4 to 4.5 cm wide and tying them tightly with leather strings or ropes. Contemporary sogo are made with thinly processed cowhide, but in the past, deer skin or dog skin was used. Wild deer skin in particular was used a lot because it was tough and had good resonance.

The diameter is about 15 cm to over 30 cm, and thre hickness is also 5 cm to over 10 cm. The sides are made of wood and are usually made using cowhide on both sides. They often have handles and some are secured to the wrist using a string.

== Use ==
In Nongak, the sogo is not a rhythm instrument like a janggu or buk, but rather a small instrument held by the dancing performers. Several sogojaebi perform various movements such as jumping up and down on the yeonpungdae and hitting the sogo, enriching the nongak performance.

== See also ==
- List of musical instruments
- Traditional Korean musical instruments
- Korean music
- Korean culture
