= Licht (disambiguation) =

Licht is a cycle of seven operas composed by Karlheinz Stockhausen between 1977 and 2003.

Licht may also refer to:

== Entertainment and Film ==
- Licht (Black Clover), a character in the manga series Black Clover
- Licht ins Dunkel, an annual telethon held in Austria since 1973.
- When the Light Comes or Licht, a 1998 adventure drama film by Stijn Coninx

== Music ==
- Licht, a 2003 album by the German band Faun
- Licht (Die Apokalyptischen Reiter album), 2008
- Licht (Nena album), 2020

== Other uses ==
- Licht (surname)
- Licht-Oase, a 1980s New Age cult also known as Ramtha

== See also ==
- Light (disambiguation)
- Leight (surname)
- Light (surname)
- Lyte (surname)
- Lyte (disambiguation)
