= Leicht =

Leicht is a surname. Notable people with the surname include:

- Don Leicht (1946–2021), American artist
- Federico Leicht (born 1974), Uruguayan journalist
- Helmut Leicht (1916–1944), German officer in the Luftwaffe
- Jacob Leicht (Wisconsin politician) (1876–1941), American politician
- Jake Leicht (1919–1992), American football player
- Stephen Leicht (born 1987), American stock car driver
- Stina Leicht, American author

== See also ==
- Leichter (surname)
- Leight (surname)
- Licht (surname)
- Light (disambiguation)
- Light (surname)
- Lite (disambiguation)
- Todd Lyght
- Lyte (disambiguation)
- Lyte (surname)
