= De Ligt =

De Ligt is a Dutch surname. It is the Old Dutch spelling and homophone of "de licht" meaning "the light one" and thus is a nickname for a slight person, belonging to the kind of family names derived from personal characteristics, roughly corresponding to the English surname Light and German family name Leicht. Notable people with the surname include:

- Bart de Ligt (1883–1938), Dutch anarcho-pacifist and antimilitarist
- Matthijs de Ligt (born 1999), Dutch footballer
