= Leight =

Leight is a surname. Notable persons with that surname include:

- Mary Ann Leight Harris (born 1939), née Leight, American former field hockey player and coach
- Valentine Leight (1837–?), builder and owner of the Valentine Leight General Store, which is on the National Register of Historic Places
- Warren Leight (born 1957), Tony Award-winning playwright

== See also ==
- Leicht (surname)
- Light (disambiguation)
- Light (surname)
- Lyght (surname)
- Licht (surname)
- Lite
- Lyte (surname)
- Lyte (disambiguation)
