= Light (disambiguation) =

Light is an electromagnetic radiation, part of which stimulates the sense of vision.

Light or Lights may also refer to:

== Illumination ==
- Lighting
- Light bulb
- Traffic light

== Arts and entertainment ==
=== Music ===
- Lights (musician) (born 1987), Canadian singer-songwriter
- Light Records, a record label

==== Albums ====
- Light (Matisyahu album) (2009)
- Light (Xu Weizhou album) (2016)
- Light, by Jeff Deyo (2004)
- Light, by DakhaBrakha (2010)
- Lights (Archive album) (2006)
- Lights (Brigade album) (2006)
- Lights (Ellie Goulding album) (2010)
- Lights, by Shishiro Botan (2024)

==== EPs ====
- Lights (Lights EP) (2008)
- Lights, by Kitchen Party (2013)
- Lights (Joohoney EP), 2023

==== Songs ====
- "Light" (KMFDM song) (1993)
- "Light" (Music for Pleasure song) (1982)
- "Light" (San Holo song) (2016)
- "Light" (Annika Wickihalder song) (2024)
- "Spotlight" (Xiao Zhan song), also known as "Light" (2020)
- "Light", by Ateez from Treasure EP.2: Zero to One (2019)
- "Light", by Big Sean featuring Jeremih from I Decided (2017)
- "Light", by Camouflage from Relocated (2006)
- "Light", by Depeche Mode from Sounds of the Universe (2009, deluxe box set edition)
- "Light", by Joe Morris from Singularity (2001)
- "Light", by Odesza featuring Little Dragon from In Return (2014, deluxe edition)
- "Light", from Next to Normal (2008)
- "Light", by Taemin from Advice (2021)
- "Light (Pop's Principle)", by Laura Nyro from Nested (1978)
- "Lights" (BTS song) (2019)
- "Lights" (Ellie Goulding song) (2010)
- "Lights" (Journey song) (1978)
- "Lights (Love Sick)", by Travis Scott (2012)
- "Lights", by Styx from Cornerstone (1979)
- "Lights", by Editors from The Back Room (2005)
- "Lights", by Inna from Nirvana (2017)
- "Lights", by Interpol from Interpol (2010)
- "Lights", by Scissor Sisters from Ta-Dah (2006)

=== Fictional characters ===
- Light (Doctor Who), a villain from Doctor Who
- Doctor Light (disambiguation), several fictional characters
- Light Yagami, a character from the anime and manga series Death Note
- Light (Twinbee), a character from the Twinbee franchise

=== Other arts and entertainment ===
- Light (journal), a journal of light verse
- Light (novel), a 2002 science fiction novel by M. John Harrison
- "Light", an episode of Legend of the Seeker, an American television series
- "Light", an episode of the Adult Swim television series Off the Air
- Light, a 2019 play based on the lives of William Light and his father

== Companies ==
- Light S.A., a Brazilian electricity distribution and retailing company
- Light (company), a digital photography peripheral company

== People ==
- Light (surname)
- Zion Lights (born 1984), English Green activist

== Places ==
- County of Light, a cadastral county in South Australia
  - Electoral district of Light
- Light Regional Council, a local government in South Australia
- Light River (South Australia)
- Light River (New Zealand)
- Light, Arkansas, an unincorporated community in the United States
- Light, Missouri, an unincorporated community in the United States

== Other uses ==
- Divine light, in theology
- Light (automobile), a car built in 1914 in Detroit
- Lights (offal), the lungs of an animal used in cooking
- Light (web browser), a lightweight web browser based on Firefox
- Light (window), the area between the outer parts of a window (head, sill and jambs), the mullions and transoms
- Skyway Light, a German paramotor design
- Ventilated cigarettes or lights, a cigarette type with a low level of nicotine
- World of Light, transcendental realm in Mandaeism
- LIGHT, the Leeds Institute of Genetics, Health and Therapeutics at Leeds School of Medicine

== See also ==
- The Light (disambiguation)
- Light Square, in Adelaide
- Light TV (disambiguation), several TV networks
- Licht (disambiguation)
- Lite (disambiguation)
- Lyte (disambiguation)
- An-Nur ("Light" or "The Light"), a sura of the Qur'an
- Pragaash (translation: "Light"), an all-girl Kashmiri rock band
