= Light (surname) =

Origin
- Languages: Old English, Middle English

Other names
- Related names: Lights, Leicht, Leight, Licht, Luce, Luz, Lyght, Lyte

Light is a surname.

== Etymology ==
Coming from Middle English, there are several possible meanings. In Middle English, lyght means a happy, cheerful person. The Old English leoht could be a person who is ‘bright’ or ‘cheerful’.

The two forms of light - leoht and lioht had distinct meanings, but became mixed over time. The Middle English word lite, coming from Old English l¯t ‘little’, also became lyght.

== People ==
- Alan Light (born 1966), American journalist and music reviewer
- Alan Light (comics) (born 1953), American founder of the Comics Buyer's Guide
- Alex Light (born 1994), American football player
- Allie Light (1935–2025), American film producer, director and editor
- Bill Light (born 1949), American farmer and politician
- Billy Light (1913–1993), English footballer
- Daniel Light (born 1975), British disc jockey
- Danny Light (1948–2014), English footballer
- Douglas Light (fl. 1990s–present), American author
- Edward Light (1747–1832), English musician, inventor of the harp-lute
- Elisha Light (1873–1952), English cricketer
- Enoch Light (1907–1978), American classical violinist and bandleader
- Francis Light (1740–1794), founder of the British colony of Penang
- George Thomas Light (1820–1896), organist and architect in South Australia
- Henry Light (1782/3–1870), third governor of British Guiana
- H. Wayne Light (1945–2015), American academic and author
- James Light (cricketer) (born c. 1803), English cricketer
- James Light (director) (1895–1964), American director and actor
- James F. Light (1921–2002), American literature scholar and university VP and provost
- Jay Light (musician) (fl. 1970s–present), American musician
- Jay Owen Light (1941–2022), American academic and university dean
- Jennifer S. Light (fl. 2000s), American academic and author
- John Light (actor) (born 1973), English cinema, television and theatre actor
- John H. Light, American lawyer, Connecticut politician and Attorney General
- Judith Light (born 1949), American television actress
- Kevin Light (born 1979), Canadian rower
- Matt Light (born 1978), American football player
- Paul Light (psychologist), British psychologist and the first Vice-Chancellor of the University of Winchester
- Paul C. Light, American political scientist
- Richard Upjohn Light (1902–1994), American neurosurgeon, aviator, cinematographer, and president of the American Geographical Society
- Timothy Light (born 1938), professor emeritus at Western Michigan University
- Walter Light (1927–1979), American musician
- Walter Frederick Light (1923–1996), Canadian businessman
- William Light (1786–1839), first Surveyor-General of South Australia
- William Light (cricketer) (1878–1930), English cricketer
- William Sidney "Cap" Light (died 1893), Texas lawman

== See also ==
- Zion Lights (born 1984), British author and environmental activist
