= Brackpool =

Brackpool is a surname. Notable people with the surname include:

- Alfred Brackpool (1857–1927), English cricketer
- Keith Brackpool (born 1957), British-American investor and business executive
