= William Light (disambiguation) =

William Light (1786–1839) was the first Surveyor-General of the Colony of South Australia.

William Light may also refer to:

- Bill Light (William C. Light, born 1949), American farmer and politician
- Billy Light (William Henry Light, 1913–1993), English footballer
- William Light (cricketer) (1878–1930), English cricketer
- William Sidney "Cap" Light (c. 1863 - 1893), Texas lawman

== See also ==
- Light (surname)
