= Leti =

Leti may refer to:

- Leti, Chakwal, a village and Union Council in Pakistan
- Leti Islands, Maluku, Indonesia
  - Leti (island), one of the Leti islands in Maluku, Indonesia
- Leti language, a language in Indonesia
- Leti language (Cameroon), a language in Cameroon
- Leti leti, an Indonesian boat
- CEA-Leti: Laboratoire d'électronique des technologies de l'information, a French-based research institute
- LETI, a nickname and an old title of Saint Petersburg Electrotechnical University

== People with the surname ==
- Emilio Leti (born 1963), Samoan boxer
- Gregorio Leti (1630–1701), Italian historian
- Nicolò Leti (1605–?), Bishop of Acquapendente

== See also ==
- Lete (disambiguation)
- Liti (disambiguation)
- Lity (disambiguation)
- Lite (disambiguation)
