= Liti =

Liti or LITI may refer to:

- Lity (Orthodox Vespers), a procession at Great Vespers in the Eastern Orthodox Church
- Lity (Orthodox memorial service), a short service for the dead in the Eastern Orthodox Church
- David Liti (born 1996), New Zealand weightlifter
- Livestock Training Institute (LITI), a college in Morogoro, Tanzania

== See also ==
- Lete (disambiguation)
- Leti (disambiguation)
- Lity (disambiguation)
- Lite (disambiguation)
