= Lete =

Lete may refer to:

- Lete (Mygdonia) an ancient city in Mygdonia, Macedon
- Lete, Nepal, a village in Nepal
- Alexis Lete (born 1996), American volleyball player, model, professional wrestler, and beauty pageant titleholder
- Xabier Lete (1944–2010), Basque writer, poet, singer and politician
- Lete, the proper name of exoplanet HD 102195 b
- A leat, a type of watercourse

== See also ==
- Leti (disambiguation)
- Leyte (disambiguation)
- Lite (disambiguation)
- Liti (disambiguation)
- Lity (disambiguation)
