= Robert H. Tourtelot =

Robert H. Tourtelot, Sr.
- Born: December 27, 1934; Evanston, Illinois
- Died: February 2, 2023 (aged 88); Palm Desert, California
- Education: Hastings College; Santa Clara University
- Occupation: Attorney
- Years active: 1967-2023
- Known for: Representing persons adjacent to O.J. Simpson's murder trial

Robert H. Tourtelot, Sr. (/ˈtɔːrtəloʊ/ TOR-tə-loh; December 27, 1934 – February 2, 2023) was a Los Angeles lawyer and former chairman of the California Horse Racing Board, the commission that regulates the California horse racing industry.

Tourtelot was first appointed to the CHRB by the Governor of California in October 1993, and was reappointed to the Board by Governor Pete Wilson in July 2001. He became acting Chairman of the Board when former Chairman George Nicholaw’s term on the Board expired in February 2000, and was unanimously elected CHRB Board Chairman in March 2000.

Tourtelot was a graduate of University of California, Hastings College of the Law. He was a principal in the law firm of Robert H. Tourtelot, PLC, which was a Los Angeles law firm specializing in litigation and transactional projects. Tourtelot was a member of the board of directors of DARE America and of the Los Angeles Police Department Crime Prevention Advisory Council. He was a special reserve officer for the LAPD. He also held a commercial helicopter pilot license.

In 1995, Tourtelot retained Mark Fuhrman, a former Los Angeles police officer, as a client. Fuhrman was accused of committing perjury during O.J. Simpson's murder trial. In May, Tourtelot filed a lawsuit against the New Yorker on behalf of Fuhrman, alleging that an article by Jeffrey Toobin had defamed Fuhrman and "destroyed [his] reputation as a police officer". After recordings of Fuhrman using racial epithets were played in court, Tourtelot dropped Fuhrman as a client and also dropped the suit against the New Yorker. He said of the matter:

When I listened to the tapes, I was profoundly disgusted and horrified. I never saw anything that indicated to me he was a racist or bigot. My personal impression, up until the tapes, was that Mark was being unfortunately maligned, his character assassinated. [...] I was distressed enough and somewhat angry that I believed I could no longer represent his interests.

In 1997, Tourtelot received a letter from the California State Bar Association in regard to his public statements condemning Fuhrman, warning that his actions were very close to breaking the bar rule prohibiting a lawyer to make statements which could harm their client's defense.

Ronald Goldman's father and sister also hired Tourtelot as part of their legal team. In 1997, Tourtelot made a public call for Simpson to be charged with perjury.

Tourtelot died on February 2, 2023 in Palm Desert, CA.
