= Lity =

Lity may refer to:

- Lity (Orthodox vespers), a procession at Great Vespers in the Eastern Orthodox Church
- Lity (Orthodox memorial service), a short service for the dead in the Eastern Orthodox Church

== See also ==
- Liti (disambiguation)
- Leti (disambiguation)
- Lete (disambiguation)
- Lite (disambiguation)
