= Richard Shapiro =

Richard Shapiro may refer to:

- Richard Shapiro (screenwriter), American television screenwriter and producer with his wife Esther Shapiro
- Richard B. Shapiro, former chairman of the California Horse Racing Board

== See also ==
- Rick Shapiro, American comedian and actor
