= Martin Long =

Martin Long may refer to:

- Martin Long (businessman) (born 1950), businessman and founder of the Churchill Insurance Company
- Martin Long (politician), Canadian politician and member of the Legislative Assembly of Alberta
- Marty Long, member of the Kansas House of Representatives
