= John Light =

John Light may refer to:

- John Light (actor) (born 1973), English actor
- John H. Light (1855–1947), American politician

== See also ==
- Light (surname)
