= Henry Lyte =

Henry Lyte may refer to:

- Henry Lyte (botanist) (1529–1607), English botanist and antiquary, publisher of A Niewe Herball (1578)
- Henry Francis Lyte (1793–1847), Anglican divine and hymn-writer
- Henry Maxwell Lyte (1848–1940), Deputy Keeper of the Public Records, 1886–1926, and historian

== See also ==
- Lyte (surname)
