= Douglas Light =

Douglas Light (born Indianapolis, Indiana) is an American novelist, screenwriter, and short story writer.

== Background ==
Light cowrote the screen adaptation (The Trouble with Bliss) of his debut novel East Fifth Bliss. The film stars Golden Globe winner Michael C. Hall of Dexter fame, Lucy Liu, and Brie Larson. His story collection, Girls in Trouble, received the 2010 AWP Grace Paley Prize for short fiction. It was published by the University of Massachusetts Press in 2011. Blood Stories was published in March 2015.

While attending graduate school at The City College of New York, he studied under Frederic Tuten and was award the Goodman Loan Fund Grant Award, the Danielle and Larry Nyman Family Project Award, and the Irwin and Alice Stark Short Fiction Prize for his writing. His first published short story, "Three Days. A Month. More." received a 2003 O. Henry Award and was selected for inclusion in the 2003 Best American Nonrequired Reading anthology, which was edited by Dave Eggers and Zadie Smith. Light's writing received a 2008 and 2010 JP Morgan Chase/NoMAA Grant and has appeared in The Alaska Quarterly Review, Guernica Magazine, Narrative, and other magazines.

He is the founding managing editor of Epiphany Magazine.

== See also ==
- Light (surname)
