= Steve Alford (politician) =

American politician

Member of the Kansas House of Representatives from the 124th district
- In office January 10, 2011 – January 14, 2019
- Preceded by: Bill Light
- Succeeded by: Marty Long

Personal details
- Born: October 14, 1942 (age 83) Wichita, Kansas, U.S.
- Party: Republican
- Spouse: Margaret (Peggy)
- Profession: Farmer

John Stephen Alford (born October 14, 1942) is an American politician. He served as a Republican member for the 124th district in the Kansas House of Representatives from 2011 to 2019.

In 2018 he stated to an audience with reportedly no black members present that marijuana should not be legalised because of African-Americans' genetics and character make up.

Basically any way you say it, marijuana is an entry drug into the higher drugs. What you really need to do is go back in the '30s, when they outlawed all types of drugs in Kansas and across the United States. What was the reason why they did that? One of the reasons why, I hate to say it, was that the African-Americans, they were basically users and they basically responded the worst to those drugs just because of their character makeup, their genetics and that. And so basically what we're trying to do is we're trying to do a complete reverse, with people not remembering what has happened in the past.

Alford resigned from committee leadership positions on January 9, 2018, following controversy surrounding these statements.
