= Eight Pieces for Four Timpani =

Composition by Elliott Carter

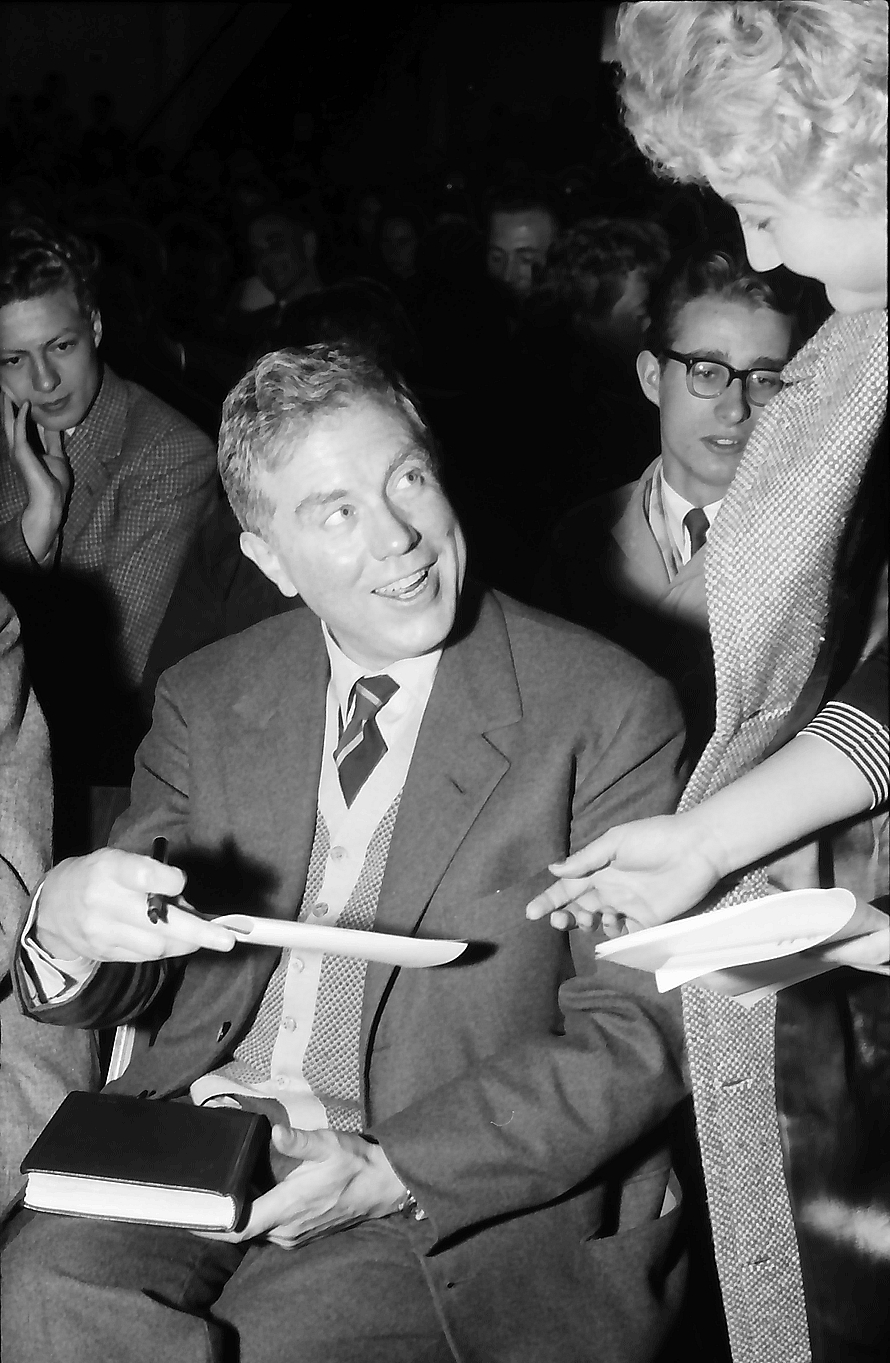
Elliott Carter at the Donaueschingen Festival in 1957

Eight Pieces for Four Timpani is a collection of short pieces by Elliott Carter for solo timpani – four drums played by one musician. Six of the pieces were composed in 1949. Two new pieces were added in 1966, and the rest were revised in collaboration with percussionist Jan Williams.

Carter wrote the pieces as studies in metric modulation and the use of four-note chords. They are a collection rather than a suite, as Carter suggested no more than four be performed at once. The pieces make extensive use of extended techniques, including playing with the back end of the mallets, varying the beating spot on the drumhead, glissandi, and sympathetic vibration.

== Pieces ==
=== 1. Saeta ===
The "Saëta" (arrow) is named after a type of Andalusian song. It is based on rhythmic acceleration.

=== 2. Moto perpetuo ===
"Moto perpetuo" (perpetuum mobile) is a quick moving piece with a constant pulse. It is played with thin rattan shafts with moleskin on the ends rather than conventional timpani mallets.

=== 3. Adagio ===
"Adagio", composed in 1966, is written for pedal timpani, and explores effects possible by changing the pitch of the drum while playing.

=== 4. Recitative ===
"Recitative" is a dramatic, slow piece that consists of three different elements: tremolo, a bolero rhythm, and an irregular pulse.

=== 5. Improvisation ===
"Improvisation" uses a set of chromatic pitches with octave displacement and a constantly varying tempo.

=== 6. Canto ===
"Canto", added in 1966, is played with snare drum sticks, and uses pedal timpani to imply a continuous melodic line.

=== 7. Canaries ===
"Canaries", a reference to the Canary dance, consists of contrapuntal dance rhythms played at different speeds with extensive metric modulation.

=== 8. March ===
"March" is a contrapuntal piece: one march rhythm is played with the head of one mallet, while another is played at a different speed with the back of the other mallet. It is perhaps the most-often played piece of the suite, and the only one ever specifically asked for in orchestral auditions.
