= List of timpani manufacturers =

The following companies manufacture timpani.

== Mass producers ==
- Adams Musical Instruments
- Ludwig Drums
- Majestic Percussion
- Premier Percussion
- Yamaha Corporation

== Historical ==
These companies no longer produce timpani, but their instruments are still widely used.

- American Drum Manufacturing Company
- Boosey & Hawkes
- Rogers Drum Company
- Slingerland Drum Company
