= Lyte (surname) =

Lyte is a surname. Notable people with the surname include:

- Christian Lyte (1989–), English cyclist
- Eliphalet Oram Lyte (1842–1913), American educator
- Farnham Maxwell-Lyte (1828–1906), English chemist and photographic pioneer
- Henry Lyte (botanist) (1529–1607), English botanist and antiquary
- Henry Francis Lyte (1793–1847), Anglican divine and hymn-writer
- Henry Maxwell Lyte (1848–1940), Deputy Keeper of the Public Records, 1886–1926, and historian
- Lavinia Lyte, fictional character in the novel Johnny Tremain by Esther Forbes
- Lyte, a band member of Delta-S
- MC Lyte, stage name of rap artist Lana Michele Moorer (b 1971)

== See also ==
- Lytes Cary, manor house in Somerset, England, once owned by the Lyte family
- Leicht (surname)
- Leight (surname)
- Light (disambiguation)
- Light (surname)
- Licht (surname)
- Lite (disambiguation)
- Lyte (disambiguation)
