= The Trouble with Bliss =

- Theatrical release poster
- Directed by: Michael Knowles
- Written by: Michael Knowles
- Based on: East Fifth Bliss by Douglas Light
- Produced by: Michael Knowles; Douglas Matejka; John Ramos
- Starring: Michael C. Hall; Chris Messina; Brie Larson; Peter Fonda; Lucy Liu
- Cinematography: Ben Wolf
- Edited by: Chunwoo Kae
- Music by: Daniel Alcheh
- Distributed by: 7A Productions
- Release date: March 23, 2012
- Running time: 97 minutes
- Country: United States
- Language: English
- Box office: $9,000

The Trouble with Bliss (formerly titled East Fifth Bliss) is an American indie comedy film directed by Michael Knowles and starring Michael C. Hall, Chris Messina, Brie Larson, Peter Fonda, and Lucy Liu. It was released on March 23, 2012, in the United States to unfavorable reviews from critics.

== Plot Summary ==
Morris Bliss (played by Michael C. Hall) is a 35-year-old man with poor job prospects who lives with his widowed father (Peter Fonda) in the East Village neighborhood of Manhattan. Morris falls into a romantic relationship with Stephanie (Brie Larson), the daughter of Jetski, his former high-school classmate (Brad William Henke). Morris also receives advances from his married neighbor, Andrea (Lucy Liu).

== Production ==
The film is an adaptation of East Fifth Bliss, a novel by Douglas Light. Director Michael Knowles knew Light in passing as they both frequent the same cigar lounge, and approached him about adapting his novel into a screenplay. They met to work on the screenplay several times a week and smoke cigars.

Rhea Perlman was initially reported to appear in the film, but scenes with her do not appear in the film's final cut.

== Reception ==
=== Critical response ===
On Rotten Tomatoes the film has an approval rating of 33% based on reviews from 18 critics, with an average rating of 4.45/10. On Metacritic the film has a weighted average score of 38 out of 100 based on reviews from 12 critics, indicating "generally unfavorable reviews".

Writing for The New York Times, Stephen Holden opined that the film "evokes forerunners as dissimilar as Moonstruck and After Hours in its eccentric mix of the everyday and the surreal" but "more often than not confuses eccentricity with originality" and ends up as a "sweet-natured, low-testosterone trifle."

The Hollywood Reporter's Frank Scheck wrote positively of the actors' performances, stating Hall has a "natural charisma" and that Liu is "appealing and funny", while adding that Fonda displays "gravitas and sly humor". However, Scheck found that film "feels far too pleased with itself". NPR reviewer Ian Buckwalter found the characters in the book "full of color and whimsy on the page" but, in the film, "without the time or space to flesh them out more, their quirks seem labored and forced." Variety's Dennis Harvey also wrote a lukewarm review, stating "Aiming for the delightfully offbeat, [The Trouble with Bliss] instead feels rudderless and incomplete, kept watchable by performers nonetheless undermined by their material. The appealing Hall has little to do beyond look befuddled; Larson and Liu are stuck playing the kind of ill-conceived screwball-movie women whose main quirks consist of being exasperating and irrational."

=== Box office ===
The film opened in limited release, earning and opening weekend gross of $4,618. Its final box office gross was $9,000.

=== Accolades ===
The Trouble with Bliss won Best Narrative Feature at the 2011 San Diego Film Festival. It was the opening-night film at the 2011 Naples International Film Festival and at the 2011 Newport Beach Film Festival.

The film was nominated for Best Editing at the 2011 Woodstock Film Festival.
