= Christian Lyte =

English cyclist (born 1989)

Personal information
- Full name: Christian Lyte
- Born: 1 March 1989 (age 37) Manchester, England, United Kingdom

Cycling career
- Sport: Cycling
- Current team: Sportcity Velo
- Discipline: Track
- Role: Rider
- Rider type: Sprinter

Amateur team
- 2006-: Sportcity Velo

Major wins
- Team Sprint junior world champion (2006, 2007); Keirin junior world champion (2007)

Christian Lyte (born 1 March 1989, Manchester) is a Barbadon, English born competitive cyclist, specialising in track sprinting. He is a former member of the British Cycling Olympic Academy. He is a junior world team sprint champion for the second year running and junior keirin world champion for 2007.

== Palmarès ==
2005
1st (United Kingdom) sprint, British National Track Championships (U16)
2nd (United Kingdom) 500m TT, British National Track Championships (U16)

2006
1st team sprint, UCI World Track Championships, junior (with Jason Kenny & David Daniell)
1st (United Kingdom) team sprint, British National Track Championships (Junior)
2nd (United Kingdom) kilo, British National Track Championships (Junior)
3rd (United Kingdom) sprint, British National Track Championships (Junior)
3rd (United Kingdom) keirin, British National Track Championships (Junior)
3rd (United Kingdom) sprint, British National Track Championships (Junior)
3rd (United Kingdom) 3km pursuit, British National Track Championships (Junior)

2007
1st team sprint, UCI World Track Championships, Mexico, Junior
1st keirin, UCI World Track Championships, Mexico, Junior
1st (Europe) sprint, Junior European Track Championships
1st (United Kingdom) keirin, British National Track Championships (Junior)
1st (United Kingdom) scratch, British National Track Championships (Junior)
2nd sprint, UCI World Track Championships, Mexico, Junior
2nd (Europe) keirin, Junior European Track Championships
2nd (Europe) team sprint, Junior European Track Championships
2nd (United Kingdom) kilo, British National Track Championships (Junior)
3rd (Europe) team sprint, U23 European Track Championships
3rd (United Kingdom) sprint, British National Track Championships (Junior)

2009
3rd (United Kingdom) keirin, British National Track Championships (Senior)

== See also ==
- Lyte (surname)
