= David Younger (American politician) =

American politician

Member of the Kansas House of Representatives from the 124th district
- In office January 9, 2023 – July 15, 2024
- Preceded by: Marty Long
- Succeeded by: Marty Long

Personal details
- Born: Garden City, Kansas
- Party: Republican
- Spouse: Kelly Younger
- Education: Fort Hays State University; Wichita State University
- Profession: Lawyer

David Younger is an American politician. He served as a Republican member for the 124th district from 2023 to 2024. He has worked as superintendent of Ulysses school district US$214.

== Biography ==
Younger earned a Bachelor of Arts from Fort Hays State University and a Master of Education from Wichita State University.
