= Lea Saskia Laasner =

Swiss writer (born 1980)

Lea Saskia Laasner Vogt (born 1980 in Winterthur) is a Swiss author. She became known through her bestselling book Alone against the Soul Catchers, which she published in 2005 with the help of Hugo Stamm.

== Life ==
In the book, she described how she moved from Switzerland to the sect's center in Belize with her parents, who joined the sect Licht-Oase (Light Oasis) in 1992. She also described life in isolation there and how she was sexually abused by the leader of the sect, called "Benno" in the book, as well as her escape from the sect in 2001.

The name "Benno" referred to the German Arno Wollensak. Julie Ravell, Wollensak's partner, described herself as a medium of the spirit Ramtha (also Ram-tha), until she was prohibited from using this name in 1997 in a ruling by the Austrian Supreme Court at the instigation of the owner of the trademark right to the word mark Ramtha, JZ Knight. She subsequently called the spirit being she allegedly channeled Maghan. She called herself "the source" in her inner circle.

Laasner received the Prix Courage in 2005 for her courageous public appearance. Taken in and looked after by a cousin in Switzerland, she completed a three-year course at a commercial college.

In 2015, Arno W. and Ravell were arrested in the Uruguayan capital Montevideo. The German judiciary applied for their extradition, which was rejected by a court in Uruguay due to the statute of limitations. The public prosecutor's office considered taking legal action against the decision.

In August 2016, the bound and gagged body of Arno W. was found on the beach of La Floresta, 50 km east of Montevideo.

== Book publication ==
- Alone against the soul catchers. My childhood in the psycho-sect. Recorded by Hugo Stamm. Eichborn, Frankfurt am Main 2005, ISBN 3-8218-5619-X.

== Documentaries ==
- Flucht aus der Esoteriksekte. Video in: Reporter from April 16, 2005 (28 minutes).
- To be continued - Escape from the psycho-sect. Video in: DOK from May 6, 2011 (39:30 minutes).
- Lea Laasner bei Menschen bei Maischberger. ARD, broadcast on November 5, 2013.
