= Fred D. Hinger =

American timpanist, educator, and instrument designer (1920–2001)

- Born: February 9, 1920; Cleveland, Ohio, U.S.
- Died: January 10, 2001 (aged 80); Huntsville, Alabama, U.S.
- Education: Eastman School of Music (BM)
- Occupations: Timpanist, educator, instrument designer
- Years active: 1941–2001
- Employer(s): Philadelphia Orchestra; Metropolitan Opera Orchestra; Curtis Institute of Music
- Known for: Principal timpanist of the Philadelphia Orchestra and Metropolitan Opera Orchestra; founder of Hinger Touch-Tone Corporation

Fred D. Hinger (February 9, 1920 – January 10, 2001) was an American timpanist, percussion educator, and instrument designer. He held the principal timpani chairs of two of the world's leading orchestras—the Philadelphia Orchestra (1951–1967) and the Metropolitan Opera Orchestra (1967–1983)—and was a longtime faculty member at the Curtis Institute of Music. Hinger was recognized internationally as an authority on timpani performance and instrument design, and his innovations—including the rotating timpani bowl and sliding-weight mallet system—influenced orchestral percussion practice worldwide. He was inducted into the Percussive Arts Society Hall of Fame in 1986.

== Early life and education ==
Hinger was born on February 9, 1920, in Cleveland, Ohio. He attended the Eastman School of Music at the University of Rochester, where he majored in music education and percussion, studying under percussionist William Street. While at Eastman, Hinger performed with the Rochester Philharmonic Orchestra under conductor José Iturbi. He received his Bachelor of Music degree in 1941.

== Career ==
=== United States Navy Band ===
After graduating from Eastman, Hinger served as percussionist and xylophone soloist with the United States Navy Band in Washington, D.C. from 1942 to 1948.

=== Philadelphia Orchestra ===
In 1948, Hinger was invited to audition for the Philadelphia Orchestra and was appointed principal percussionist. In 1951, he accepted the orchestra's principal timpani position, which he held for 16 years until 1967.

=== Metropolitan Opera Orchestra ===
In 1967, Hinger left the Philadelphia Orchestra to become principal timpanist of the Metropolitan Opera Orchestra in New York City, a position he held until his retirement in 1983. He joined American Federation of Musicians Local 802 upon moving to New York in 1967.

== Teaching ==
Hinger taught at the Curtis Institute of Music in Philadelphia for approximately 15 years during his tenure with the Philadelphia Orchestra. He also held teaching positions at the Manhattan School of Music and the Yale School of Music.

Hinger maintained a private teaching studio at his home in Leonia, New Jersey.

== Instrument design and innovations ==
Hinger was a prolific instrument designer and inventor. In the early 1960s, he registered the Hinger and Touch-Tone trademarks and founded the Hinger Touch-Tone Corporation, which manufactured timpani mallets and percussion equipment.

His innovations included:

- The rotating timpani bowl, which allows the player to change beating spots without disturbing the drumhead
- Sliding weights on timpani and snare drum sticks, permitting the player to change the tonal color produced by the same mallet
- The Space-Tone snare drum
- The Pro-Custom 1 aluminum mallet handle with a patented adjustable weight system

Between 1967 and 1970, Hinger handcrafted several drums in his apartment in Fort Lee, New Jersey. His mallet designs continue to be manufactured as the Fred Hinger Touch-Tone Timpani Series by Malletech.

== Publications ==
Hinger authored instructional works that became standard references in the field of timpani performance:

- Technique for the Virtuoso Timpanist (1981), published by Jerona Music Corporation
- Solos for the Virtuoso Timpanist, a collection of advanced solo works for timpani

== Awards and honors ==
- Percussive Arts Society Hall of Fame, inducted 1986

== Personal life and death ==
Hinger died on January 10, 2001, in Huntsville, Alabama, at the age of 80. He was survived by his wife, Marjorie Jean, children William and Shirley, and six grandchildren.
