= Lyght =

Lyght is a surname. Notable people with the surname include:

- Andrew Lyght (born 1949), Guyanese-American contemporary artist
- Andrew Lyght (cricketer) (1956–2001), Guyanese cricketer
- Todd Lyght (born 1969), American football player and coach
