= California Horse Racing Board =

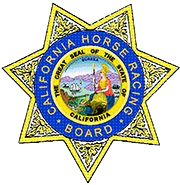

Department overview
- Formed: January 1, 1933; 93 years ago
- Jurisdiction: Government of California
- Headquarters: Sacramento, California
- Department executive: Scott Chaney, Executive Director
- Parent department: Business, Consumer Services and Housing Agency
- Website: chrb.ca.gov

The California Horse Racing Board (CHRB) is an independent agency of the State of California, United States. Established in 1933, The CHRB has authority over the regulation of horse racing and parimutuel betting at licensed California race tracks. The function of the CHRB is to watch over authorized California horse races to protect the public from fraudulent operations. It is formally part of the Business, Consumer Services and Housing Agency.

The CHRB has seven members who are appointed by the Governor of California. The CHRB also acts as a liaison with other states' horse racing boards and help make possible off-track betting with other race tracks. The CHRB has committees which oversee the assorted duties of the Board. One of these is the steward's committee which acts on the complaints and concerns of the stewards. The current Executive Director of the CHRB is former steward Scott Chaney, who was one of three stewards who controversially voted not to disqualify Bayern from a victory in the 2014 Breeder's Cup Classic, despite the fact that the horse had significantly interfered with several horses at the start of the race. After receiving criticism from horseplayers, Chaney famously stated that he knew nothing about handicapping. From Bloodhorse.com criticism that the incident changed the race by eliminating the pace rival Moreno, Chaney said, "Did it change the outcome? Any interference could. At the start of a mile-and-a-quarter race we're really loathe to make a change. You really don't want us handicapping the race." Chaney now oversees the stewards committee responsible judging the performance of the state's racetrack stewards.

== CHRB Chairmen ==
- Keith Brackpool (2010)
- John C. Harris (2009)
- Richard B. Shapiro (2006 - 2008)
- John C. Harris (2004 - 2005)
- Roger Licht (2003)
- Alan Landsburg (2002)
- Robert H. Tourtelot (2000 - 2001)
- George Nicholaw (1999)
- Ralph M. Scurfield (1992 - 1998)
