= Šime Spitzer =

Croatian Zionist

- Born: Shimon Spitzer; 18 October 1892; Đakovo, Austro-Hungarian monarchy, (now Croatia)
- Died: October 1941 (aged 49); Banjica concentration camp
- Cause of death: Murdered in Holocaust
- Spouse: Yehudit (née Lantzer) Spitzer
- Relatives: Yaakov and Linka Spitzer (parents)

Šime Spitzer (born Shimon Spitzer; 18 October 1892 – October 1941) was a Croatian Zionist, notable member of the Jewish community Zagreb and general secretary of the "Federation of Jewish confessional communities of Yugoslavia" (Savez jevrejskih vjeroispovjednih općina Jugoslavije - SJVOJ).

== Life ==
Spitzer was born in Đakovo on 18 October 1892 to a Jewish family. From his early youth, he was a member of the Zionist and Jewish organizations in Croatia. He co-founded in Zagreb, in 1919, together with Aleksandar Licht and other Zionists the "Union of the Jewish confessional municipalities in the Kingdom of SHS" (Savez jevrejskih vjeroispovjednih općina u Kraljevini SHS), later known as "Federation of Jewish confessional communities of Yugoslavia" (Savez jevrejskih vjeroispovjednih općina Jugoslavije - SJVOJ).

In 1937 he was elected general secretary of the "SJVOJ". Spitzer election induced the rebellion among the Jews from the Jewish communities Sarajevo and Belgrade who favored their own nominee, the Sarajevo-born Mihael Levi. All Sarajevo and some Belgrade members of the central committee of the SJVOJ have resigned. They all asked that Spitzer, a nominee of the Jewish community Zagreb, resign. Leadership of the SJVOJ insisted on Spitzer election.

In 1937 Spitzer protested at the office of Žika Simonović, Minister of Justice in the Kingdom of Yugoslavia, against the antisemitic articles in the newspapers such as: "Balkan", "Mlada Hrvatska", "Erwache" and "Sturm". He also made an outcry toward the fact that the Protocols of the Elders of Zion are, again, distributed freely.

As early as 1933, and especially after the Anschluss in 1938, the expulsion of Jewish citizens became eminent. During the 1930s Spitzer and other notable members of the Jewish community Zagreb helped the refugee Jews from Austria and Nazi Germany. He headed the refugee relief committee in Belgrade. Spitzer and "Federation of Jewish confessional communities of Yugoslavia" cared for 11,200 refugee Jews. After the outbreak of World War II Jews from the Nazi Germany were strictly forbidden to directly immigrate into Mandatory Palestine. As Jews born in Austria and Germany they were considered, by the British authorities, enemy aliens. Only refugees who had already reached a neutral country were able to obtain immigration papers.

On 31 December 1939 three Yugoslav excursion boats, "Car Nikola", "Car Dušan" and "Kraljica Marija" were carrying refugees to a winter harbor in the city of Kladovo when the Danube river froze. On 22 September 1940, the refugees reached the Šabac in Serbia. There, under Spitzer leadership, ongoing aid was provided to the group. Spitzer tried desperately to obtain passage for the refugees and immigration certificates, so that they could legally proceed to Mandatory Palestine. Unfortunately, after the Axis occupation of Serbia in 1941, most of the refugees were murdered by the German occupation forces. Out of 1,400 Jewish refugees, only between 200 and 280 survived. In October 1941 Spitzer was murdered at the Banjica concentration camp. He was survived by his wife who later made Aliyah to Israel.

== Bibliography ==
- Goldstein, Ivo (2005). Židovi u Zagrebu 1918 - 1941. Zagreb: Novi Liber. ISBN 953-6045-23-0.
- Israeli, Raphael (2013). The Death Camps of Croatia: Visions and Revisions, 1941-1945. New Jersey: Transaction Publishers. ISBN 978-1412849753.
