= Harp lute =

Musical instrument

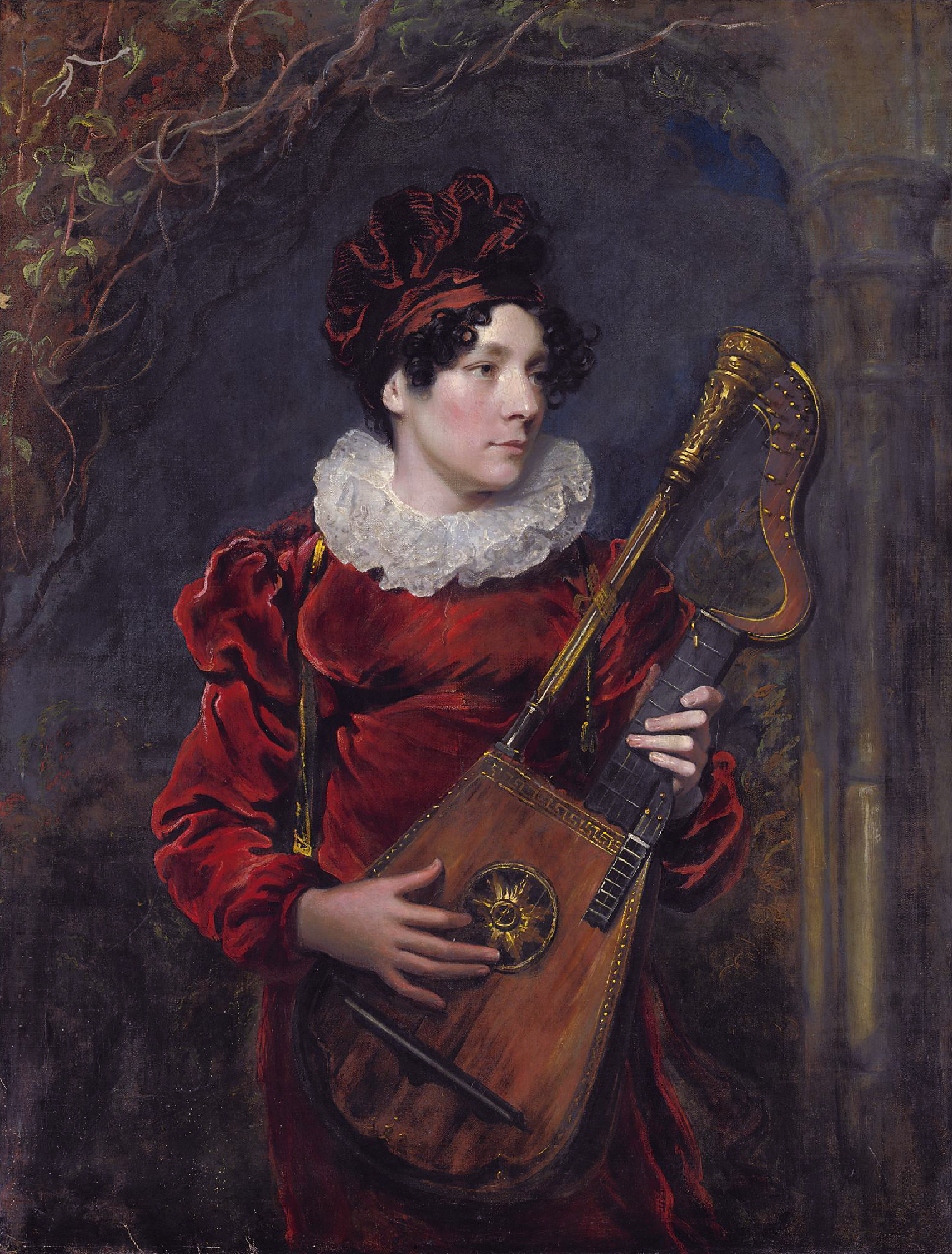
George Henry Harlow: Kitty Stephens (1794–1882) with a harp lute

The harp lute, or dital harp, is a musical instrument that combines features of harp and lute and to increase its compass of the latter. It was invented in 1795 by Edward Light, (though an earlier form is shown in The Garden of Earthly Delights (~1500) by Hieronymus Bosch).

== Description ==
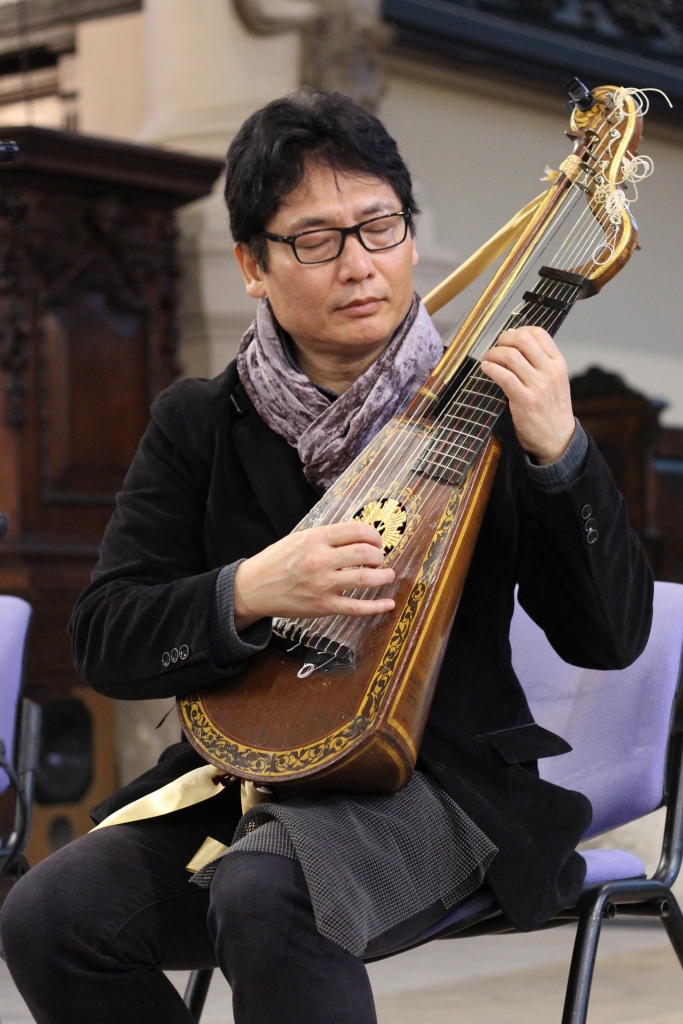
An early 19th century harp lute being played by Taro Takeuchi

The harp lute owes the first part of its name to the characteristic mechanism for shortening the effective length of the strings; its second name of "dital harp" emphasizes the nature of the stops, which are worked by the thumb in contradistinction to the pedals of the harp worked by the feet.

This instrument consists of a pear-shaped body, to which is added a curved neck supported on a front pillar or arm springing from the body, and therefore reminiscent of the harp. There are twelve catgut strings. The curved fingerboard, almost parallel with the neck, is provided with frets, and has in addition a thumbkey for each string, by means of which the accordance of the string is mechanically raised a semitone at will. The dital or key, on being depressed, acts upon a stop-ring or eye, which draws the string down against the fret, and thus shortens its effective length. The fingers then stop the strings as usual over the remaining frets. A further improvement was patented in 1816 as the British harp lute. Other attempts possessing less practical merit than the dital harp were the lyra-guitarre, which appeared in Germany, at the beginning of the 19th century; the accord-guitarre, towards the middle of the same century; and the keyed guitar.

== See also ==
- Kora (instrument)
- Gravikord
