= The Light =

The Light may refer to:

== Film ==
- The Light (1919 film), a film directed by J. Gordon Edwards
- The Light (2004 film), a French film (original title: L'équipier)
- The Light (2025 film), a German film
- The Light (2026 film), a Spanish-Belgian film (original title: La luz)
- The Light: Swami Vivekananda, a 2013 Indian film by Utpal Sinha

== Music ==
- The Light, a trance music production duo, now known as Proper Filthy Naughty
- The Light (Glass), a 1987 symphonic composition by Philip Glass
- The Light (Afrika Bambaataa album), 1988
- The Light (BGYO album), 2021
- The Light (Spock's Beard album), 1995
- "The Light" (BGYO song), 2021
- "The Light" (Common song), 2000
- "The Light" (Disturbed song), 2015
- "The Light" (Juice Wrld song), 2023
- "The Light" (Spock's Beard song), 1995
- The Light, a 2008 album by Swedish band Reinxeed (now Majestica)
- "The Light", a song by Adam Lambert on his 2015 album The Original High
- "The Light", a song by Mason Jennings on his 2000 album Birds Flying Away
- "The Light", a song by Supreme Beings of Leisure on their 2008 album 11i
- "The Light", a song by Alesha Dixon on her 2009 re-release of The Alesha Show
- "The Light", a song by Metronomy on their 2019 album Metronomy Forever
- Peter Hook & the Light, English rock band

== Other ==
- The Light (short story), 1957 story by Poul Anderson
- "The Light" (Stargate SG-1), an episode in the science fiction series Stargate SG-1
- The Light, Durham, a proposed cultural venue at Aykley Heads in Durham, England.
- The Light, Leeds, a shopping and leisure complex on The Headrow in Leeds City Centre, Leeds, England
- The Light (newspaper), a British conspiracy newspaper
- The Light Waterfront, a neighbourhood in George Town, Malaysia
- The Light, a video game development team responsible for the game Rex
- The Light Cinemas, a British independent cinema chain
- An-Nur (The Light), 24th sura of the Qur'an
- Secret Society of Super Villains or "The Light", in the Young Justice animated universe
- The Light, an alternative name for the Assiniboine chief Wi-jún-jon
- The Light (drug), Dipropyltryptamine (DPT, synthetic designer drug and entheogen taken as sacrament)
- A tunnel of light, often called "the light", a common feature of near-death experiences

== See also ==
- The Lights, American rock band
- TheLights, or the Lights, an English band
- The 'Lights, American TV show
- Light (disambiguation)
