= George Nicholaw =

American radio executive (1927–2014)

George Nicholaw (November 17, 1927 – August 9, 2014) was a CBS radio executive and chairman of the California Horse Racing Board (CHRB).

Nicholaw was a CBS Radio employee from 1955 to 2003. In August 1967, he was appointed vice president and general manager of KNX in Los Angeles and in 1968 guided the station's switch from music to an all-news format. Nicholaw was appointed to the California Horse Racing Board in 1992 by Governor Pete Wilson. He served as chairman of both the Security and Licensing Committee and the Pari-mutuel Operations Committee, holding great responsibility in the area of regulating racetrack operations.

Nicholaw served eight years as a member of the CHRB, and was elected to be chairman for the year 1999, replacing the outgoing long-term chairman Ralph M. Scurfield. Nicholaw retired as a commissioner in February 2000 when his second four-year term on the CHRB expired.

He is the uncle of theatre director, choreographer and performer Casey Nicholaw.
