= Leichter =

Leichter is a German word meaning "lighter". It is also a surname and may refer to:

- Franz S. Leichter (1930–2023), politician in the New York State Assembly and Senate
- Hope Jensen Leichter, American educationalist
- Karl Leichter (1902–1987), Estonian musicologist
- Käthe Leichter (1895–1942), Austrian economist, women's rights activist, journalist, politician
- Max Leichter (1920–1981), German wrestler

== See also ==
- Käthe Leichter Prize, the Austrian State Prize for women's research, gender studies and gender equality in the workplace
- Leicht
