= Lite FM =

Lite FM may refer to:

- Lite FM (New Zealand), a former radio station in Christchurch, New Zealand
- Lite (radio station), a radio station in Malaysia
- Connect Radio 106.8, formerly 106.8 Lite FM, a radio station in Peterborough, United Kingdom
- Most Radio 105.8 FM, formerly Lite FM 105.8, a radio station in Jakarta, Indonesia
- WLTW 106.7 FM, a radio station based in New York City, United States
