= American Drum Manufacturing Company =

American timpani manufacturer

The American Drum Manufacturing Company was a family-owned timpani manufacturer based in Denver, Colorado. Former Denver Symphony Orchestra timpanist Walter Light, who built a custom set of drums for himself, founded the company in 1950 when his colleagues began asking him to build timpani for them. The company was voluntarily dissolved in 2016.

The company offered four lines of instruments:

- The Mark XIV was American Drum's top-of-the-line model
- The Mark XI was similar to the Mark XIV, but the bowls are made of lighter weight copper
- The Metropolitan Model Type B was the budget model. The bowls are made from the same copper as the Mark XI, but the Metropolitan drums have less features.
- Continental Chain Tuned was the company's line of chain timpani. They were designed to have similar timbral properties as the pedal drums.

The company also built cases and covers for their drums and reconditioned old timpani.

Since every drum was custom-built, the buyer was able to choose from different bowl shapes with different timbral properties and make any desired modifications to the frames of the drums. For example, European and North American timpanists set their drums up in different orders. The pedals have to be on the opposite sides of the drums in each of the setups.

== See also ==
- List of timpani manufacturers
