= Keith Brackpool =

British-American investor and business executive

- Born: 1957 (age 68–69)
- Citizenship: American
- Occupations: Business executive, investor, horse-racing industry professional
- Years active: 1980s-present
- Employer(s): Stronach Group, Cadiz Inc.

Keith Brackpool (born 1957) is a British-American investor and business executive. After starting his career as an investment banker and CEO for Albert Fisher's North American operations, he co-founded the water resource company Cadiz Inc. in 1983, holding a number of executive positions including CEO, and is currently chairman of the board. In 1989 he started the company 1334 Partners LP., which owns and invests in residential and commercial properties in California. From 2013 - 2018 he served as a shareholder and executive board member for the Stronach Group, a thoroughbred horse-racing company, and chairman of West Coast operations, including Golden Gate Fields and Santa Anita Park racetracks. Brackpool has also held public policy positions in California, including co-chairman of the Agriculture and Water Transition Task Force in the administration of California Governor Gray Davis, a member of the Commission on Building for the 21st Century, and chairman of the California Horse Racing Board.

== Biography ==
=== Early career ===
Keith Brackpool was born in 1957 in England, with his childhood spent in Surrey and London. Described by The Guardian as “a buccaneering self-made businessman," in the 1980s he came to the United States, after pleading guilty to criminal charges relating to securities trading in Britain. In the United States, he headed the American division of the food distribution company Albert Fisher, serving as both director and CEO of North American Operations from 1989 until 1991. In 1983, Brackpool partnered with geologist Mark Liggett to found Cadiz Inc., a company focused on locating water sources for development and sale to municipalities. Studying satellite images, Liggett located an aquifer in the Mojave Desert and Cadiz bought a patchwork of plots from the railroads in the area, amassing 55 square miles of "creosote crumb." Brackpool became a Cadiz Inc. director in September 1986. In 1989 he started the company 1334 Partners LP., which owns commercial real estate, and was a shareholder in a Polly Peck subsidiary.

=== Cadiz Inc. ===
In the mid-1990s, Cadiz developed a water transport plan that involved storing excess water from the Colorado River in an aquifer on Cadiz property, with the water to be sold to California communities during droughts. The proposal was developed with and then pitched to the Metropolitan Water District of Southern California (MET) of southern California, and at the time was considered “the largest public-private project in the state's history." In 2001 Brackpool was appointed chairman of the Cadiz Inc. board of directors in addition to his roles as president and CEO. After federal approval of the project in 2002, controversy surrounded the water proposal, with critics such as Senator Dianne Feinstein disagreeing with the U.S. Interior Department’s assessment that "any negative effects on the environment could be prevented."

During early processing of the water proposal with MET, Cadiz was also involved in agricultural development. In 1993, Cadiz secured permits from San Bernardino County to expand its agricultural operations and develop up to 9,600 acres (3,900 ha) of its properties in the Mojave Desert. In 1996 the Cadiz Land Company acquired Sun World International Inc., which had been in Chapter 11 bankruptcy protection since 1994. At the time, Cadiz Land grew fruit and vegetables and owned 42,000 acres in Southern California. Brackpool also expanded into international projects, exploring a development in Egypt which the company hoped would "become the largest single agricultural project in the world." In 1998 Brackpool was appointed co-chairman of the Agriculture and Water Transition Task Force in the administration of California governor Gray Davis, and in 1999 Davis appointed him to the Commission on Building for the 21st Century. In October 2002 the board of the MET voted against the project "by a razor-thin margin." Sun World filed for Chapter 11 bankruptcy protection in early 2003 and was sold by Cadiz in 2005 to Black Diamond Capital Management for $127.8 million.

In 2009, Cadiz announced a new project design focused on supplying fresh water solely from the Cadiz aquifer to 400,000 Southern Californians. According to Cadiz, the Cadiz Valley Water Conservation Recovery and Storage Project would pump groundwater before it evaporates and deliver it via an underground pipeline stretching 43 miles (69 km), to be constructed within an existing railroad corridor. Brackpool stepped down as president of Cadiz Inc. on April 12, 2011, while the proposal was still in its environmental review phase, with colleague Scott Slater taking over. He remained CEO and chairman. The Santa Margarita Water District approved the project’s environmental documents in July 2012, followed by approval of the project by the San Bernardino County Board of Supervisors in October 2012.

In 2013, Slater assumed the CEO role, while Brackpool remained chairman of the Cadiz board. The project faced several lawsuits between 2012 and 2014 brought by environmental groups and local oil and gas operatives that mine the desert for salt. In May 2014, the Superior Court rejected all claims against the project and upheld the approvals. These rulings were subsequently appealed to the California Court of Appeal, which sustained the lower court rulings in May 2016 and upheld the project's approvals. The project approval process proved politically controversial. Under a Trump Administration change of policy, the project may not have to undergo federal review. As of 2018, Brackpool continues to serve as chairman of the Cadiz board.

=== Horse racing ===
Brackpool was appointed to the California Horse Racing Board (CHRB) by Governor Arnold Schwarzenegger on September 24, 2009, and he was elected chairman on January 15, 2010. Later in 2010, Brackpool stated at a California Thoroughbred Breeders Association and Oak Tree Racing Association conference that the racing industry needed to increase audience attendance by improving the onsite experience. He also argued for exchange wagering as an alternative to “ontrack casino wagering," stating "if you could merge British racing experience with the American football model, you would have the greatest thing you could experience." Along with other members of the board, Brackpool worked for greater distribution of races through channels such as HRTV and TVG.

In January 2013, Brackpool left his role as chairman of the CHRB and became a shareholder and member of the executive board at the Stronach Group. He was appointed chairman and head of Stronach Group’s operations on the west coast, which includes the Golden Gate Fields and Santa Anita Park racetracks. In his position with the Stronach Group in 2013 he oversaw the restoration and expansion of San Luis Rey Downs, which had seen a surge of activity as a training center after the closure of nearby Hollywood Park.

In 2013 Brackpool was temporarily named CEO of the Santa Anita racetrack. In the summer of 2013, Brackpool renovated Santa Anita Park, and thoroughbred horse racing returned to the park in September. He explained that the renovations “were centered around improving the audiovisual experience at the track" as well as visitor experience, with the clubhouse, sports bar, and Chandelier Room upgraded. In 2013, Brackpool renovated Santa Anita Park. According to Daily Racing Form, the renovations met with “generally positive reviews." In December 2013, Santa Anita began installing a new dirt track surface, after changes in state legislation made synthetic turf no longer a requirement. Attendance at Santa Anita improved over the following two years. Along with his Santa Anita roles, through his positions at Stronach Brackpool was chairman of Golden Gate Fields and chairman of the Los Angeles Turf Club.

Brackpool was an active thoroughbred owner with both personal ownership of race horses and a stakeholder position in Golden Pegasus Racing, a partnership with other Stronach Group executive board members. In January 2014, Brackpool's horse Gervinho competed in the Grade II Sir Beaufort Stakes with jockey Rafael Bejarano, winning the $200,000 purse. Other notable horses owned by Brackpool have included Dynaformer’s sons Kolo and Bolo, who both won the Santa Anita Eddie Logan Stakes at two years of age. In February 2016 Bolo won the Grade 2 Arcadia Handicap at Santa Anita in an upset.

In April 2018, Brackpool stepped down from his positions at Stronach, and filed a lawsuit in California against the company, saying he was owed $40 million because of an agreement he entered with the organization when he was hired in 2012. In October 2018, he filed a lawsuit for $400 million in Ontario, Canada, against Belinda and Alon Ossip, a former chief executive of the company, alleging that the two mismanaged company funds and illegally appropriated control of family trusts affiliated with the company.

== Real estate investments ==
Personally invested in a number of real estate projects, since 1989 Brackpool has owned 1334 Partners LP., which holds commercial real estate. Brackpool was the longtime owner of the Manhattan Country Club, which has hosted since 1994 the annual Manhattan Wine Auction, a popular fundraising event. In June 2017, Brackpool sold the Manhattan Country Club to Bay Club Co. for $73 million.

== Personal life ==
A single father of two children, Brackpool lives in California.

== See also ==
- Water in California
