= Andrew Lyght =

Guyanese artist

Andrew Lyght (born 1949 in Georgetown, Guyana) is a contemporary artist living in Kingston, New York. Lyght is a mixed media artist, often combining drawings, painterly elements, industrial objects, and sculptural wooden assemblages.

== Biography ==
Lyght holds Guyanese, Canadian, and U.S. citizenship. Some of his work includes references to forms and objects from his childhood in Guyana, such as kites, sails, oil drums, and archaic rock writings found in the interior of Guyana.

Lyght's artistic interest and abilities were recognized in Guyana during his childhood. He began winning art competitions while a student and was invited as a teenager to study with Edward Rupert Burrowes, Guyana's leading modern artist, at Queens College Thomas Lands, and subsequently became Burrowes's apprentice. Lyght stated in an interview that Burrowes encouraged him to “make my name at home and then leave Guyana and start afresh in a new environment.”

After Burrowes's death, and having won all the available art prizes in Guyana, Lyght went to Canada, where one of his paintings had been exhibited at the Guyana-Barbados Pavilion of Expo 67 in Montreal. In 1969 Lyght won a scholarship to study at the Sadye Bronfman Centre and became a Canadian citizen. Lyght lived and worked in Montreal until 1977, though he represented Guyana at the São Paulo Art Biennial in 1971. During his time in Montreal he received several grants from the Canadian Council for the Arts, was involved with Vehicle Art Inc., Canada's first artist-run gallery, and exhibited work at Vehicle and other venues including Montreal's Museum of Fine Arts, where he had a solo show in 1974.

In 1977, Lyght moved to New York, where he did a two-year residency at P.S. 1 in Long Island City (now MoMA PS1). Since that time, he has continued to show his work in group and solo exhibitions around the world, with a 2022 solo show, "Linear Dimensions," at the Al Held Foundation in Boiceville, N.Y., and another, "Second Nature," in 2020 at Anna Zorina Gallery in New York. Lyght's work is included in the 2023 group show "After 'The Wild': Contemporary Art from The Barnett and Annalee Newman Foundation" at The Jewish Museum, in New York, and was in the exhibition "A Fast Moving Sky" at The Third Line, in Dubai, United Arab Emirates (2017). He had a retrospective in 2016 at the Samuel Dorsky Museum of Art at the State University of New York, New Paltz, N.Y., for which an exhibition catalogue, “Full Circle,” was published by the SUNY Press. The exhibition was curated by South African independent curator Tumelo Mosaka.

Reviewing Lyght's retrospective at the Dorsky Museum for The New York Times, critic Joyce Beckenstein stated that Lyght's work “soars on the arc of a simple line. Mr. Lyght blurs all distinctions between drawing, painting, sculpture, digital photography and installation art. Each iteration of his distinct style charts the personal odyssey of a naturalized African-American artist from Guyana ... to Montreal, to Brooklyn, to Europe and, finally, to Kingston, N.Y., the birthplace of America’s first indigenous art movement, the Hudson River School.”

Lyght's other museum installations include "Andrew Lyght: 3-D Paintings" at the Nassau County Museum of Fine Art, Roslyn, N.Y. (1985), for which a catalogue was published by the museum, and "Painting Structures" at Smith College Museum of Art, Northampton, Mass., in 1983. He was included in the 2010 "Global Africa Project" at the Museum of Arts & Design, New York, an exhibition that was co-curated by Lowery Stokes Sims and explored the impact of African visual culture on contemporary art, craft, and design around the world.

Lyght received major grants from the Adolph and Esther Gottlieb Foundation in 2010 and the Barnett and Annalee Newman Foundation in 2004.

His work is held in collections including the Centre Georges Pompidou, Paris; the Jewish Museum, New York; the World Bank Art Program, Washington, D.C.; the Studio Museum in Harlem, New York; and the Smith College Museum of Art, Northampton, Mass. Lyght is represented by Anna Zorina Gallery, New York.
