= Roger Licht =

American lawyer

Roger H. Licht (born 1956) is the former chairman of the California Horse Racing Board (CHRB) and a prominent horse racing legal expert.

Licht was a Los Angeles lawyer who for 15 years had been representing jockeys, trainers, and other licensees in disputes with the CHRB, before Governor Gray Davis appointed him a racing commissioner in 2001. He served on the CHRB for three years and was elected chairman in November 2002. Licht is credited with accelerating the launch of Advanced Deposit Wagering (ADW) in California, a move that has since helped to increase fan interest in the state's horse racing industry.

In April 2005 Licht was named a member of Youbet.com's independent wagering compliance committee.
