= Jennifer S. Light =

- Occupations: Professor of Science, Technology and Society

Jennifer S. Light is Professor of Science, Technology and Society at the Massachusetts Institute of Technology. Light's research investigates the work of technical experts in the political process, with special interest in these figures' influences on US urban history. Light serves on the editorial boards of the Journal of Communication and the IEEE Annals of the History of Computing.

An essay by Light from 1999, "When Computers Were Women", discusses an aspect of the history of computers — specifically that women were not credited for their work on the ENIAC computer, which was America's first electronic computer to automate ballistics computations during World War II. The women built the machine which replaced them, yet their contributions to it were kept out of history.

== Education ==
- PhD History of Science, Harvard University
- MPhil History and Philosophy of Science, Cambridge University (Lionel de Jersey Harvard Scholar)
- AB History and Literature, Harvard College

== Works and publications ==
- The Nature of Cities: Ecological Visions and the American Urban Professions, 1920-1960 (Johns Hopkins University Press, 2009)
- From Warfare to Welfare: Defense Intellectuals and Urban Problems in Cold War America (Johns Hopkins University Press, 2003; 2005)
- Articles appearing in New Media and Society; Technology and Culture; Journal of Urban History; Harvard Educational Review; Ecumene; Environment and Planning D: Society and Space; Journal of the American Planning Association; New Directions for Evaluation; International Journal of Urban and Regional Research; and Gender, Place, and Culture.
- When Computers were Women (Technology and Culture, 1999)

== Awards and honors ==
- Honorable Mention, Lewis Mumford Prize, 2009
- Derek Brewer Visiting Fellow, Emmanuel College, Cambridge University, 2005
