= Licht-Oase =

- Formation: c. 1980s
- Founder: Arno Wollensak; Julie Ravell
- Dissolved: c. 2015
- Type: New Age cult
- Headquarters: Originally Oerlinghausen, Germany
- Region served: Germany, Austria, France, Portugal, later Belize
- Members: c. 40

Licht-Oase (Light Oasis) was a New Age cult led by Arno Wollensak and Julie Ravell with around 40 members. It was also known as Ramtha.

== History ==
In the 1980s Arno Wollensak was a follower of Rajneesh, eventually starting his own group. The group lived in Germany, Austria, France and Portugal before relocating to Belize.

Reports of sexual abuse of minors within the cult lead to a police investigation. In 2007 Wollensak failed to appear in court. He and Ravell fled to Uruguay using forged Surinamese documents in 2008. The case was transferred to the German Federal Criminal Police in 2014. Wollensak and Ravell were arrested by police in Uruguay and brought to Montevideo on 12 June 2015.

A request for his extradition to Germany was made, but denied by an Uruguay court due to statute of limitations. Wollensak was then released. He was found murdered in Uruguay August 28, 2016.

== Accounts from inside the cult ==
The practice in the group to separate children from their parents inspired the artwork "Disappearing Mother" by former member Katharina Meredith.

Lea Saskia Laasner described her experiences in the cult in her book Allein gegen die Seelenfänger. Meine Kindheit in der Psycho-Sekte for which she won the Prix Courage in 2005.
