= Alfred Brackpool =

English cricketer

Personal information
- Full name: Alfred Brackpool
- Born: 11 October 1857; Crawley Down, Sussex, England
- Died: 24 October 1927 (aged 70); Worth, Sussex, England
- Batting: Right-handed
- Bowling: Right-arm medium

Domestic team information
- Years: Team
- 1880: Sussex

Career statistics
Competition	First-class
Matches	1
Runs scored	2
Batting average	1.00
100s/50s	–/–
Top score	2
Balls bowled	136
Wickets	1
Bowling average	62.00
5 wickets in innings	–
10 wickets in match	–
Best bowling	1/62
Catches/stumpings	–/–
- Source: Cricinfo, 11 December 2011

Alfred Brackpool (11 October 1857 – 24 October 1927) was an English cricketer who played in one first-class cricket match for Sussex. Brackpool was a right-handed batsman who bowled right-arm medium-pace. He was born at Crawley Down, Sussex.

Brackpool made a single first-class appearance for Sussex against the Marylebone Cricket Club at Lord's in 1880. In Sussex's first innings he was dismissed for 2 runs by George Hearne. He took the wicket of Thomas Pearson in the Marylebone Cricket Club's first-innings, finishing with figures of 1/62 from 34 overs. Sussex followed-on in their second-innings, during which he was dismissed for a duck by James Robertson, with the Marylebone Cricket Club winning by an innings and 178 runs. This was his only major appearance for Sussex.

He died at Worth, Sussex on 24 October 1927.
