= Ralph M. Scurfield =

American businessman (1928–2013)

Ralph Merle Scurfield (August 20, 1928 – October 15, 2013) was an American businessman who served on the California Horse Racing Board (CHRB) from 1991 through 1999, serving as chairman of the board from 1992 to 1999.

== Life and career ==
Ralph Merle Scurfield was born in Pennsylvania on August 20, 1928.

Scurfield's involvement in civic affairs dated back to the 1960s when he served on the Sacramento Planning Commission and the Sacramento City Council. He was president of the Scurfield Company in Sacramento, dealing in property investment and commercial development and management. Scurfield also served as an officer of the Association of Racing Commissioners International from 1994, becoming president of that organization in 1998 and serving one term as chairman in 1998-99.

Scurfield was first appointed to the California Horse Racing Board in 1991 by Governor George Deukmejian, and was twice re-appointed to the board by Governor Pete Wilson. Scurfield was first named chairman in 1992 and retained that post with the unanimous support of his colleagues until his term as CHRB commissioner expired September 26, 2000.

As chairman of the CHRB Scurfield lead the board through a decade that brought enormous change to the California horse racing industry as it faced unprecedented competition from other forms of gambling and entertainment. Scurfield was influential in bringing about license-fee relief to the horse racing industry, personally appearing before legislative committees to explain the importance of the industry in terms of jobs, revenue, and its impact on the overall economy.

During Scurfield’s reign as chairman of the CHRB, he directed his efforts to abolish substance abuse among industry workers. He influenced support for the Winners Foundation, the employee assistance program for persons in the California horse racing industry with problems related to drug or alcohol abuse, and created the Human Substance Abuse Advisory Committee, which brought medical experts and industry leaders together to deal with the problem. Scurfield was also responsible for establishing a voluntary program that enables trainers to test their employees and new-hires for drugs.

John Van de Kamp, president of the Thoroughbred Owners of California, praised Scurfield saying "Ralph Scurfield’s tenure on the CHRB was distinguished by dedication to duty and to his obligations, his availability, his willingness to listen, and a real commitment to the industry as a whole. His service provides a good example for others who will follow in his footsteps."

Ken Maddy, former California State Senator said of Scurfield: "As chairman, Ralph came before the Legislature and pointed out what horse racing means to California economically, and he explained what the industry needed from its elected officials. He played a vital role in gaining license-fee relief for the industry. To me, his leadership role in supporting that legislation was his most significant accomplishment."

Scurfield latterly headed the Sacramento Harness Association. He died from complications of surgery on October 15, 2013, at the age of 85.
