= Light (company) =

American digital photography company

Light Labs Inc.
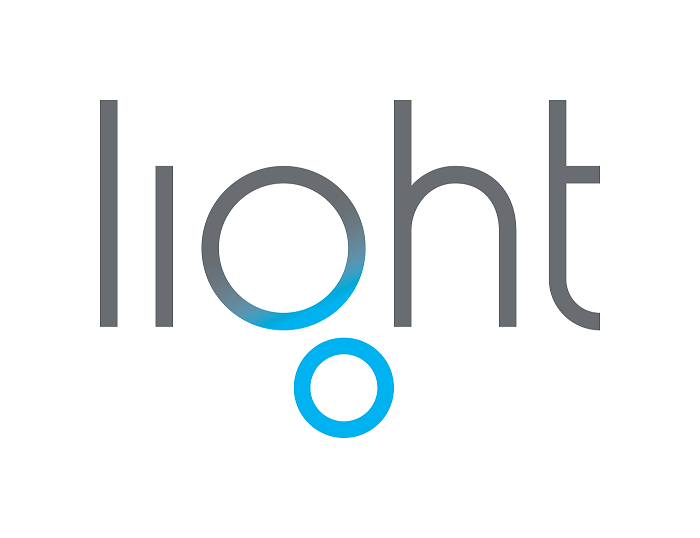
- Type: Private
- Industry: Mobile digital photography
- Founded: 2013; 13 years ago in Palo Alto, California
- Founder: Dave Grannan (CEO); Rajiv Laroia (CTO)
- Fate: Dissolved after asset purchase by John Deere
- Headquarters: Redwood City, California, U.S.
- Area served: Global
- Products: Multi-lens camera for smartphones
- Website: light.co (archived)

Light Labs Inc. was an American digital photography company that developed a multi-lens and multi-sensor camera designed for embedding in smartphones and mobile devices. The company's first product, the L16, is a standalone version with 16 camera modules. It planned to eventually provide mobile devices with higher-quality photo capabilities and true optical zoom. In 2020, the company pivoted from cameras for smartphones to imaging technology for automotive.

In May 2022, the tractor maker John Deere acquired parts of Light and hired some of the former staff.

== History ==
Light was founded in 2013 by Dave Grannan (CEO) and Rajiv Laroia (CTO) in Palo Alto, California. With an increasing demand for better cameras in smartphones, Grannan and Laroia utilized innovations regarding smaller camera modules and high-quality inexpensive lenses in their first designs for the L16.

By April 2015, the company was working on a 52-megapixel prototype that could zoom without pixelation, alter depth of field, and capture images in low light with limited image noise. Less than a year later, the company officially announced the Light L16 camera.

=== Funding ===
In June 2014, the company received $9.7 million in Series A funding from an investor group including Bessemer Venture Partners, CRV, GlobalFoundries CEO Sanjay Jha, and Qualcomm executive chairman, Paul E. Jacobs. Jacobs also joined Light's board of directors per the agreements of his investment deal.

In July 2015, the company received an additional $25 million in a second round of funding led by investment firm Formation 8. Other investors included Bessemer Venture Partners, CRV, StepStone Group, Sanjay Jha of GlobalFoundries and CrunchFund, and Foxconn's FIH Mobile. On July 30, 2015, Light entered into an agreement with Foxconn to allow the mobile phone manufacturer to use its technology.

A year later, Light announced $30 million in Series C funding, led by GV (formerly known as Google Ventures). As of July 2016, the total funding received was $64.7 million.

On July 18, 2018, Light announced $120 million Series D funding round, led by SoftBank Vision Fund. Leica Camera AG also participated in the financing.

== Technology ==
=== Product Development ===
Initial Light prototypes involved the use of numerous cameras to achieve higher quality images from mobile devices. One prototype (later to be called the L16) contains 16 camera modules, all of which capture the image simultaneously. Each of the modules corresponds to an equivalent focal length (5 at 35mm, 5 at 70mm, and 6 at 150mm). The cameras were designed to produce up to 52-megapixel images. The technology of the prototype included over 10 apertures and used folded optics to bounce light off of mirrors and send it down multiple lens barrels onto optical sensors. Through computational imaging, the multiple images combine into a high-resolution photograph. The company developed software to interpret lighting conditions and object distance to provide overall improvements to the image. The multi-focal-length design, along with mirrors capable of aiming the 70mm and 150mm lenses, allows clear optical zoom for photos and videos.

Android software for operating the camera was also developed by Light. Additionally, a dedicated software application for Windows and Mac called Lumen, was created to control depth-of-field post-capture. The company also created its own algorithms in order to quickly combine all the images captured from the units.

==== L16 ====
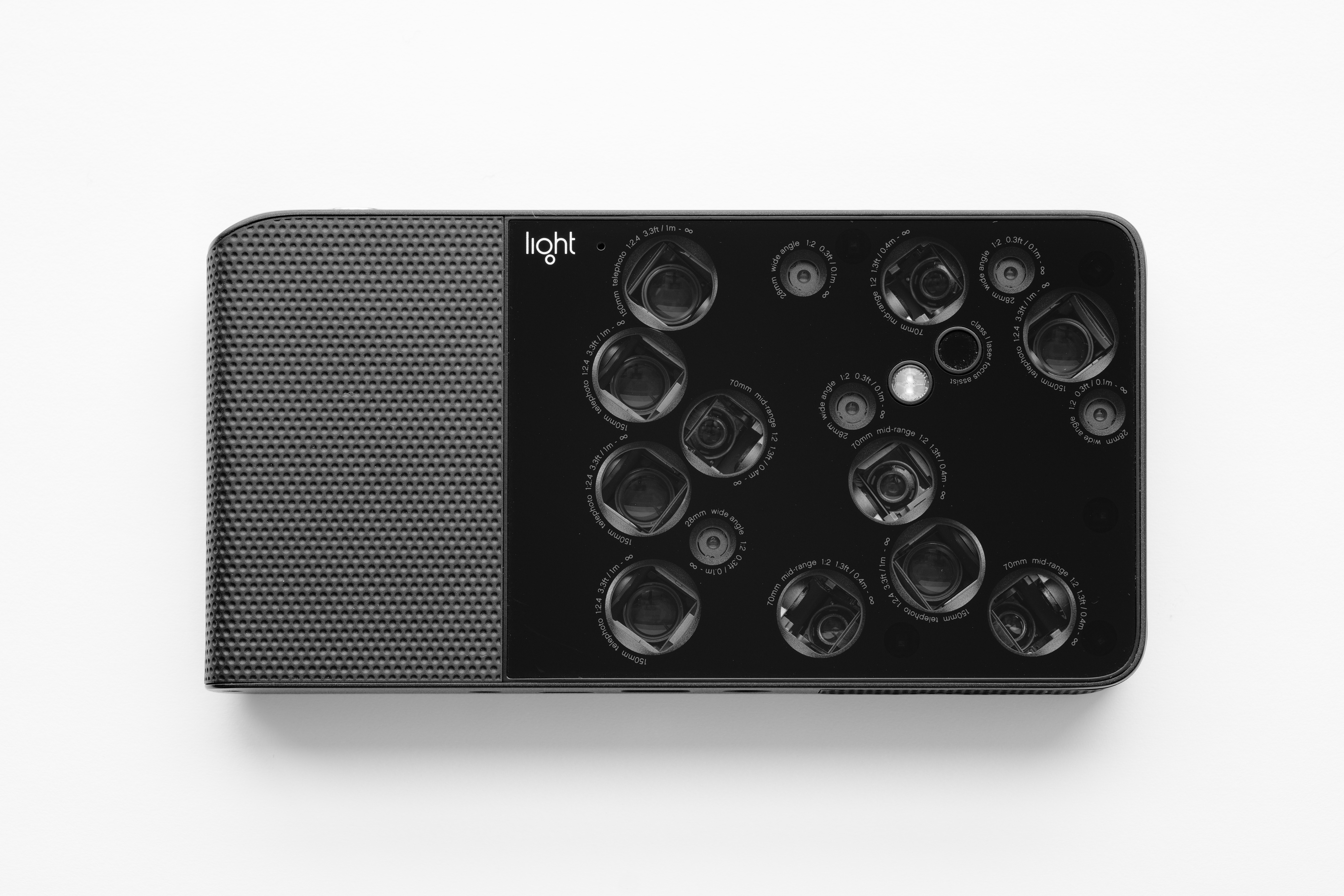
The Light L16.

Light announced a standalone camera, the L16, as a product in October 2015. The fixed aperture was widened from F/2.4 to F/2.0 in December 2016. The company shipped the first production units of the L16 in July 2017. In March 2018, the L16 was made available in the United Kingdom. Light's support team said that “We are ending support for the L16 at the end of 2019”.
