= Richard B. Shapiro =

American politician

Richard B. Shapiro is a former chairman of the California Horse Racing Board. He is a Malibu real estate developer whose family has been active in California horse racing for three generations.

Shapiro, a Republican, was first appointed to the CHRB by California Governor Arnold Schwarzenegger on October 14, 2004. He served as the board's chairman for the years 2006 to 2008 before resigning from the CHRB in December 2008.

On August 18, 2009, Shapiro pleaded "no contest" to a misdemeanour charge of vandalism in connection with the key-scratching of the 2008 Jaguar sedan owned by Jerry Jamgotchian, a horse-owner who was one of Shapiro's harshest critics during his time on the board.

Shapiro was a victim of the Madoff investment scandal.
