= H. Wayne Light =

American psychologist (1945–2015)

- Born: 1945
- Died: 2015 (aged 69–70)
- Occupation: Psychologist

H. Wayne Light (1945–2015) was an academic and author. He was known as the author of Light's Retention Scale, a counseling tool designed to help parents and teachers determine whether a child should be retained.

Light's Retention Scale was first published in 1977, with four subsequent revisions. Used for children in kindergarten through high school, the test evaluates a student in nineteen categories, including attendance, intelligence, motivation, academic performance, and several other factors. Physical size, gender, and age are also taken into account. According to the publisher, Academic Therapy Publications, more than one million copies have been sold and more than 90 percent of all North American schools use this tool.

He has also written Beyond Retention a handbook for teachers, Mental Retardation, a guide for professionals, School Vandalism and other articles. He worked a number of years in private practice as a police psychologist and earned a Diplomate in Police Psychology. During 1999, Light assisted law enforcement in several situations and was named "Public Safety Officer of the year" by California Senator Milton Marks.

After an illness during 1997, he retired from his police psychology practice and returned to his original occupation of helping children. Light has been named Outstanding School Psychologist in California. In 1999, Light married his long-time secretary Jessie Tapia. They live in the Central Valley of California.
