= Aleksandar Licht =

Croatian Zionist leader (1884–1948)

Doctor Aleksandar Licht
- Born: 1884; Sokolovac, Austro-Hungarian monarchy, (now Croatia)
- Died: 27 June 1948 (aged 64); Montreux, Switzerland
- Education: University of Zagreb
- Occupation: Doctor of law
- Relatives: Hermann Licht (brother)

Dr. Aleksandar Licht (1884−1948) was a Croatian Zionist leader and founder of the Zionist movement in Croatia.

Licht was born in village Sokolovac, near Koprivnica to a Croatian Jewish family. As a child he moved with his family to Zagreb. Licht was educated in Zagreb where he finished elementary and high school. He graduated as a lawyer at the Faculty of Law, University of Zagreb. In 1909 he was promoted to a Doctor of law at the University of Zagreb. In 1913 he opened a law firm in Zagreb, but in 1914 he was drafted to the Austro-Hungarian Army. Upon completing military service, Licht returned to Zagreb where he practiced law at his firm.

He was the founder and spiritual leader of Zionism in Croatia. As a young man he was elected chairman of the Jewish youth circle "Literarni Sastanci" (Literary Meetings), which soon became a Zionist society. He was also the editor of "Židovska smotra" (The Jewish review). In Vienna he was the chairman of "Bar Giora", a group of Zionist students from Yugoslavia. After its foundation, in 1909, he was the elected secretary of the "Zionist federation of South Slavic countries". In 1919 he was one of the leading Zionists, with Šime Spitzer, who founded the "Union of the Jewish confessional municipalities in the Kingdom of SHS" (Savez jevrejskih vjeroispovjednih općina u Kraljevini SHS) in Zagreb. In 1919 Licht also helped to found the "Zionist federation of Yugoslavia" (SCJ - Savez cionista Jugoslavije) in Zagreb, where Licht first served as a secretary and later as an elected president. He also befriended Croatian politician Frano Supilo. Under Licht leadership Zagreb was the strongest Zionist center in the newly founded Kingdom of Yugoslavia. He was also the only Zionist from Yugoslavia who was a member of the action committee of the World Zionist Congress. Lich was the founder of the so-called "Zagreb school" of Zionism which represented uncompromised and radical Zionism. Under his leadership Croatian Zionists, through the years, raised over 50-60% of total funds collected in the Kingdom of Yugoslavia for the Jewish National Fund. Although he was not a wealthy person, Licht was a great philanthropist who often aided various Zagreb, students, sport and charitable societies. Licht was among the financiers who funded the "Society for building a monument of Tomislav of Croatia". Licht believed that the major hate toward the Jews in Croatia was spread by the Serbian press in Croatia, and that some Serbs have antisemitism in a depth of their soul. During the 1930s riots in the Mandatory Palestine, Licht always advocated peaceful solution over armed conflict.

Licht openly criticized the rising wave of antisemitism in Nazi Germany and Soviet Union during the 1930s. During World War II Licht was arrested by Gestapo with the other notable Zagreb Jews like; Hinko Gotlieb, Lavoslav Šik, Slavko Mayer, Robert Deutsch-Maceljski (of a notable Deutsch-Maceljski family), Branko Alexander (of a notable Alexander family) and others. All of them were taken to Graz, Austria where they were questioned about the Croatian Jewish community. They all were soon released except Mayer who was never seen again. Upon his return to Zagreb, Licht managed to get his identity document back and soon escaped to Slovenia. From Slovenia Licht immigrated to Switzerland through Italy in Autumn, 1943. In Switzerland, at first, he was placed in a refugee camp. With help from the Croatian sculptor Ivan Meštrović, Licht soon found a permanent residence. While in Switzerland Licht actively collected financial aid for the Zagreb Jewish community which was then transmitted to Zagreb by various channels. Licht died in Montreux, Switzerland on 27 June 1948 as one of the rare Croatian Jews who managed to survive the Holocaust. His body was moved from Switzerland to Land of Israel where he was buried in 1955.

== Bibliography ==
- Snješka Knežević, Aleksander Laslo (2011). Židovski Zagreb. Zagreb: AGM, Židovska općina Zagreb. ISBN 978-953-174-393-8.
- Goldstein, Ivo (2005). Židovi u Zagrebu 1918 - 1941. Zagreb: Novi Liber. ISBN 953-6045-23-0.
- Kraus, Ognjen (1998). Dva stoljeća povijesti i kulture Židova u Zagrebu i Hrvatskoj. Zagreb: Židovska općina Zagreb. ISBN 953-96836-2-9.
- Goldstein, Ivo (2001). Holokaust u Zagrebu. Zagreb: Novi Liber. ISBN 953-6045-19-2.
- Skolnik, Fred (2006). Encyclopedia Judaica. Farmington Hills, Michigan: Gale-Macmillan Reference USA. ISBN 978-0028659282.
