= Light (automobile) =

Defunct American motor vehicle manufacturer

The Light was a brass era automobile built in Detroit, Michigan by the Light Motor Car Company in 1913 and 1914.

== History ==
The Light, also called the Light Six, was a six-cylinder 30 hp car. It came as a touring, demi-tonneau or roadster model, selling from $1,050 up to $1,250, equivalent to $40,179 in 2025. The company closed in 1914.
