= Doctor Light =

Doctor Light is the name (or codename) of various fictional scientists.

- Doctor Light (character), any of the characters from DC Comics
  - Doctor Light (Arthur Light), the DC Comics supervillain
  - Doctor Light (Kimiyo Hoshi), the DC Comics superheroine
- Doctor Light (Mega Man), the Mega Man character

== See also ==
- The Light, an evil scientist who battled Starman
