= Marty Long =

American politician

Member of the Kansas House of Representatives from the 124th district
- Incumbent
- Assumed office August 21, 2024
- Preceded by: David Younger
- In office 2019–2023
- Preceded by: Steve Alford
- Succeeded by: David Younger

Personal details
- Party: Republican

Marty Long is an American politician. He serves as a Republican member for the 124th district of the Kansas House of Representatives.

In 2018, Long was elected for the 124th district of the Kansas House of Representatives. He succeeded Steve Alford. He served from 2019 to 2023.

In August 2024, Long was appointed to his old seat in the Kansas House of Representatives after his successor David Younger resigned.
