= Edward Light =

English musician and inventor

Edward Light (1746/7 – 1832) was an English musician and inventor of the harp-lute.

Little is known of his life; he was at one time organist of Trinity Chapel, Conduit Street, London. He endeavoured with ephemeral success to introduce improvements in the harp and guitar. He died in 1832, at the age of eighty-five.

== Inventions ==
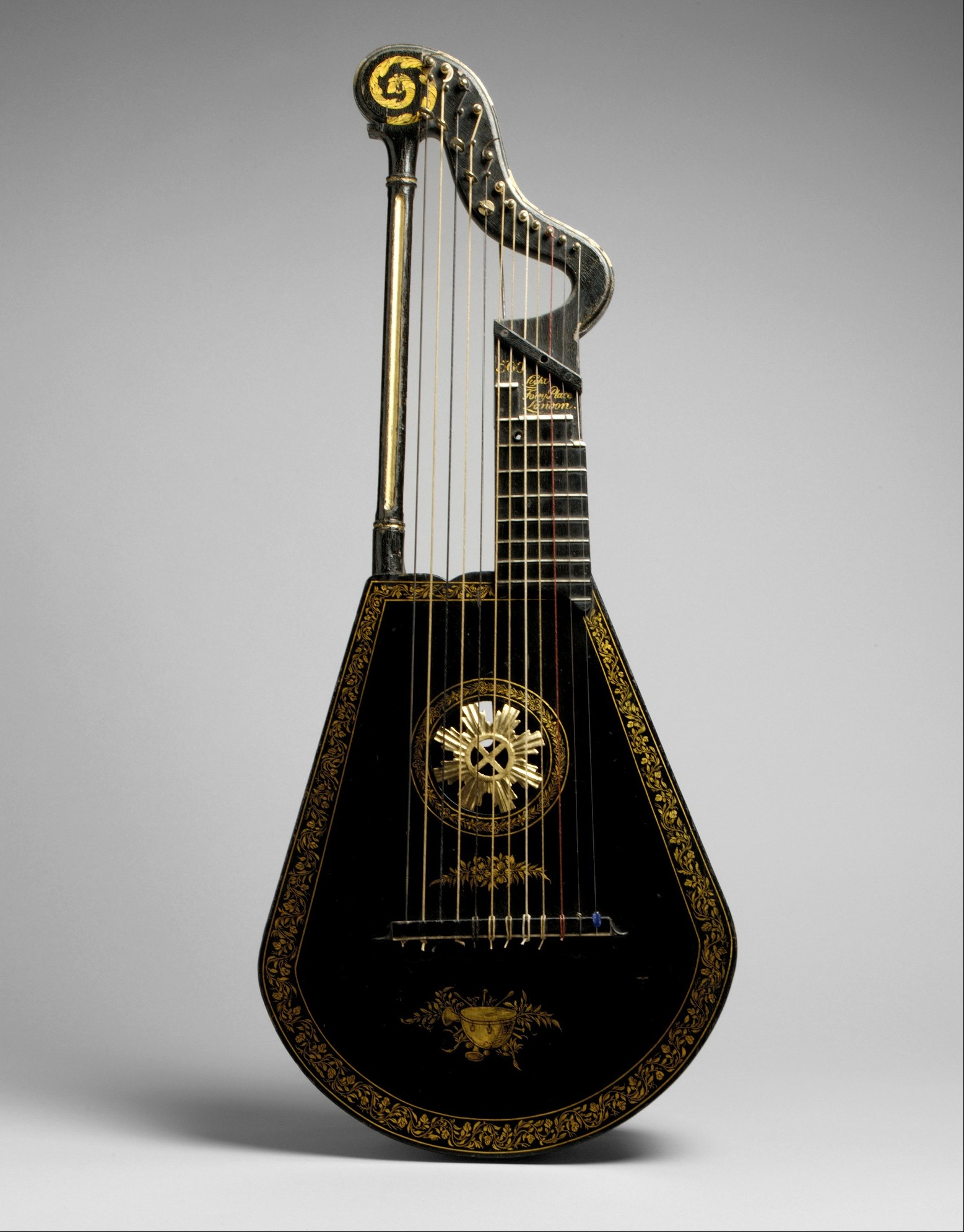
Harp-lute by Edward Light at the Metropolitan Museum of Art, New York

Light invented

1. the harp-guitar about 1798, an instrument resembling the pedal-harp, with neck and head not unlike the Spanish guitar. There are seven strings tuned like those of the English guitar, with the addition of the violin G.
2. The harp-lute, 1798, with twelve catgut strings, a larger instrument than No. 1, its neck resembling that of the pedal-harp.
3. The harp-lyre, 1816, differing from No. 2 in the shape of the body, which is flat at the back.
4. The British lute-harp, for which Light took out a patent dated 18 June 1816, a chromatic lute-harp, distinguished by certain pieces of mechanism called ditals, or thumb-keys, which when pressed raise the corresponding string one semitone.
5. The dital harp, which was similar to, if not identical with, the last invention. It is tuned like the pedal-harp, but the order of the strings is reversed, the bass being nearer the performer. The instrument is described by Thomas Busby as strong and sweet in tone, and "unquestionably, the pedal-harp excepted, the most eligible accompaniment to the human voice".

== Works ==
Publications by Light include:

1. The Ladies' Amusement, a collection of lessons and songs for guitar, in six numbers (1783);
2. A First Book on Music (1794);
3. The Musette, a collection of lessons and songs for the guitar, with instructions for playing, issued monthly about 1795;
4. Concise Instructions for Playing on the English Lute (c.1800);
5. A Collection of Songs, arranged for harp-lute, lyre, and guitar (c.1810);
6. Preludes, Exercises, and Recreations, for harp-lute solo (c.1810);
7. A New and Complete Directory to the Art of Playing on the British Lute-Harp (1817). It contains a full-page engraving showing the attitude of a performer, and a list of suitable compositions.
