= Light TV =

Light TV may refer to:

- Light TV, a former name of the American television network TheGrio
- Light TV, a subchannel of Philippine TV station DZOZ-DTV
  - Light TV, a related network of ZOE Broadcasting Network
