= Lyte =

Lyte may refer to:

- Electrolyte
- Lyte (surname), multiple people with the surname
- Lyte Records, British record label
- Thomas Lyte, English company making silverware, gifts and trophies

== See also ==
- Light (disambiguation)
- Lite (disambiguation)
