= Bill Light =

American politician

Member of the Kansas House of Representatives from the 124th district
- In office January 11, 1999 – January 10, 2011
- Preceded by: Eugene L. Shore
- Succeeded by: Steve Alford

Personal details
- Born: January 8, 1949 (age 77) Elkhart, Kansas, U.S.
- Party: Republican

William C. Light (born January 8, 1949) is an American farmer and politician. He was a member of the Kansas House of Representatives from 1999 until 2011.

Light was born on January 8, 1949, in Elkhart, Kansas. He is a farmer. His religion is Baptist. Rolla and Elkhart are located in the extreme southwest corner of Kansas.

With no prior elected office experience, Light was elected and began service in the Kansas House of Representatives in 1999. He represented the 124th District of Kansas. Ulysses, Kansas, is the largest city in the district. He is serving his 6th term in the legislature. Light is a member of the Republican Party of Kansas.

Light's committee assignments included the Appropriations Committee and the Agriculture and Natural Resources Committee. He has previous service in the Energy and Utilities Committee and the Veterans, Military, and Homeland Security Committee. Light was appointed to the 2007 Judiciary Interim Committee, which was his first experience on the Judiciary Committee, and said it would be a "learning experience."
