= Licht (surname) =

Licht is a German and Yiddish surname meaning "light". The surname is also an ornamental surname within Jewish communities (Yiddish: ליכט) with the same meaning. Notable people with the surname include:

- Alan Licht (born 1968), American guitarist
- Aleksandar Licht (1884–1948), Croatian Zionist leader
- Alexander Licht (1952–2026), German politician
- Chris Licht, American television producer
- Frank Licht (1916–1987), 67th Governor of Rhode Island from 1969 to 1973
- Hugo Licht (1841–1923), German architect
- Jason Licht (born 1971), general manager for the Tampa Bay Buccaneers of the National Football League
- Judy Licht, American television and print journalist
- Lucas Licht (born 1981), Argentinian-Israeli football player
- Maayan Licht (born 1993), Israeli operatic sopranist
- Roger Licht, former chairman of the California Horse Racing Board and horse racing legal expert
- Sascha Licht (born 1974), German former footballer
- Sonja Licht (born 1947), Serbian sociologist and political activist
