= Lite =

Lite may refer to:

== Food and drugs ==
- Diet food, food or beverage that is part of a weight loss program or diet
- Diet soda, a version of soda pop
- Low-alcohol beer, beer with little or no alcohol content
  - Miller Lite, a brand of light beer
- Lights (cigarette type), a cigarette with a milder flavor

== Media ==
=== Music ===
- Lite (band), a Japanese band
- Lite (radio station), a Malaysian radio station
- 106.7 Lite FM, a branding for WLTW, a variety radio station in New York City as part of iHeartRadio

=== Other media ===
- London Lite, a British newspaper
- Lite TV, a television channel

== People ==
- Lori Lite (born 1961), American author, producer and entrepreneur

== Places ==
- Líté, a municipality in the Czech Republic

== Computing ==
- Lightweight software
  - Crippleware, software that purposely has some functions removed
- Litecoin, a crypto-currency

== Other uses ==
- A piece of glass in a window or door
- Nintendo DS Lite, a handheld game console
- Arcfox Lite, a Chinese small electric car
- stock ticker symbol for Lumentum

== See also ==
- Light (disambiguation)
- Lite FM (disambiguation)
- Lite-Brite, an electric toy that allows lit pictures to be created
- Lyte (surname)
