= Harley Psalter =

11th century illuminated manuscript

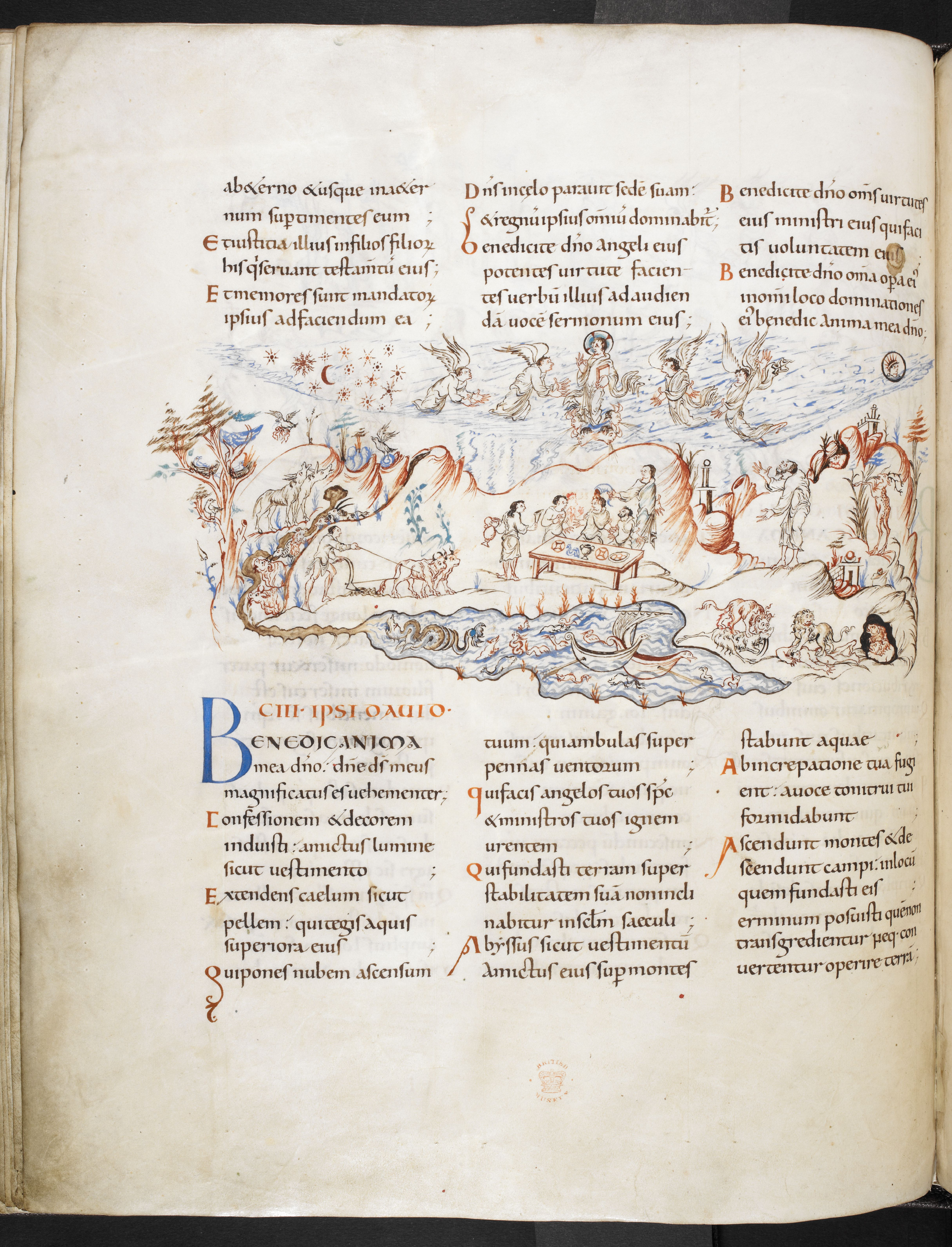
Psalm 104 on page f55v

The Harley Psalter (British Library Harley MS 603) is an illuminated manuscript of the second and third decades of the 11th century, with some later additions. It is a Latin psalter on vellum, measures 380 x 310 mm and was probably produced at Christ Church, Canterbury. The most likely patron of such a costly work would have been the Archbishop of Canterbury at the time, possibly Æthelnoth, who was consecrated in 1020 and remained at Canterbury until 1038.

== Description ==
The Harley Psalter is the earliest of three surviving medieval copies of the Carolingian Utrecht Psalter of c. 820, then at Canterbury; the later ones were the 12th-century Eadwine Psalter and the Anglo-Catalan Psalter. It contains more than 100 11th-century coloured pen and wash drawings in the Utrecht Style, ending abruptly at Psalm 143:12, probably due to loss of pages rather than interruption of the original work. In addition to the drawings being done in the Utrecht Style, a large amount of them are copied directly from the drawings found in the Utrecht Psalter. The Psalter is particularly interesting for having been written in three phases. The first phase seems to have been begun with the intention to produce a reasonably exact copy of the illustrations and layout of the Utrecht Psalter, although the Gallic form of the psalms in this work was substituted for the Roman form. This phase encompasses the first (ff.1–27) and third (ff.50–57) phases of the manuscript and is written by a single scribe.

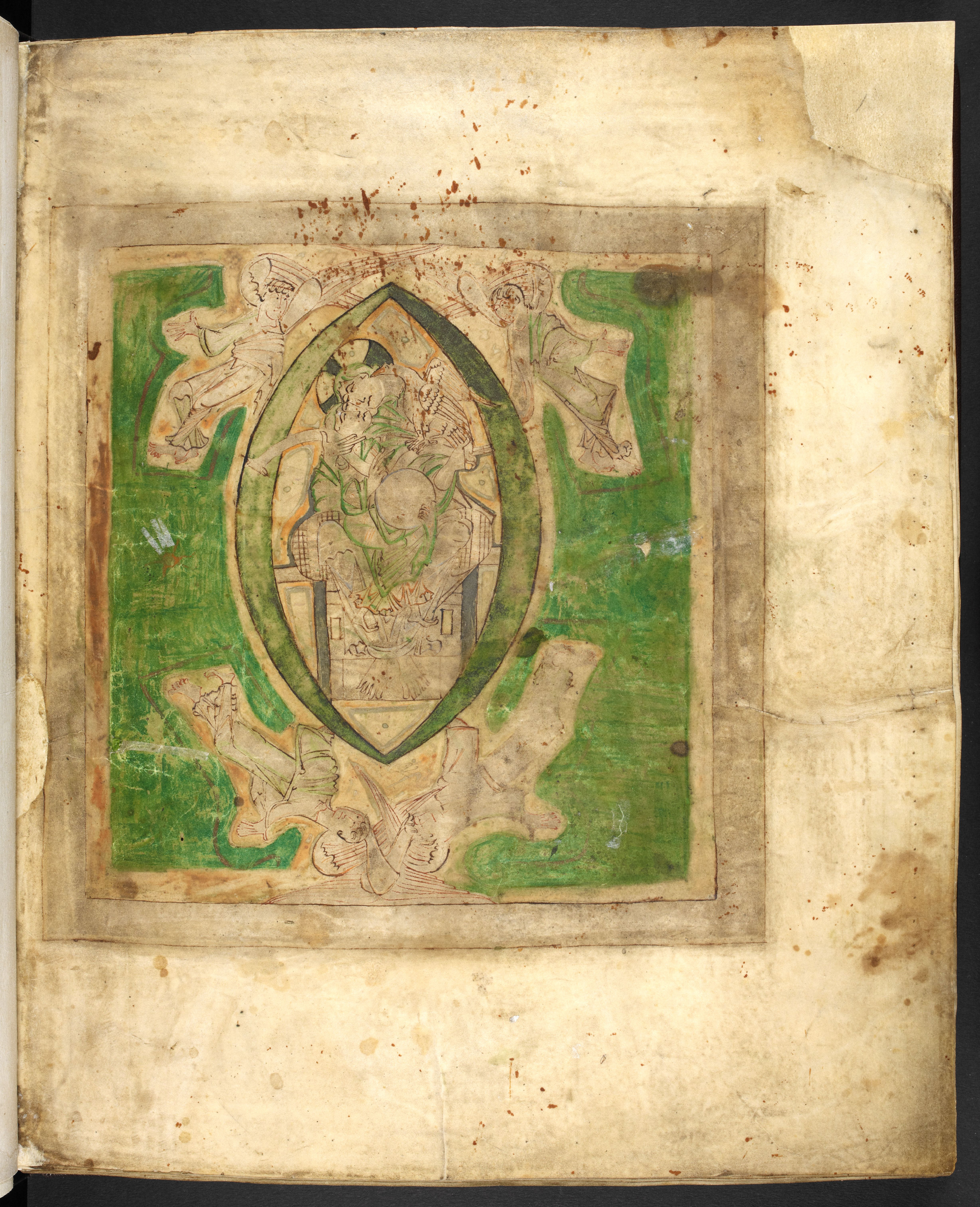
Miniature of the Trinity on the first page (f.1r)

The second phase of production is represented by the fourth section (ff.58-73), where the same scribe from the first phase continued to write out the psalms, but rather than imitating the layout of the Utrecht Psalter, he simply left gaps for illustrations at the beginning of each psalm. The artist who filled these gaps strayed further from the Utrecht Psalter as well, using much simpler compositions.

Phase three of the manuscript is encompassed in the second section of the Psalter (ff.28-49) which seems to have been written later by the scribe Eadui Basan, although his hand seems either elderly or infirm when compared to the work he produced 1018. Only two 11th-century drawings are found in this part of the manuscript; it has been suggested that this was written to replace a portion of the Psalter which had been lost or damaged, as it fills a gap between two sections of seemingly earlier work.

Janet Backhouse described the Harley Psalter as "one of the most important of all pre-Conquest English illuminated manuscripts". William Noel wrote an excellent monograph on the manuscript.

== Illuminations from the Psalter ==
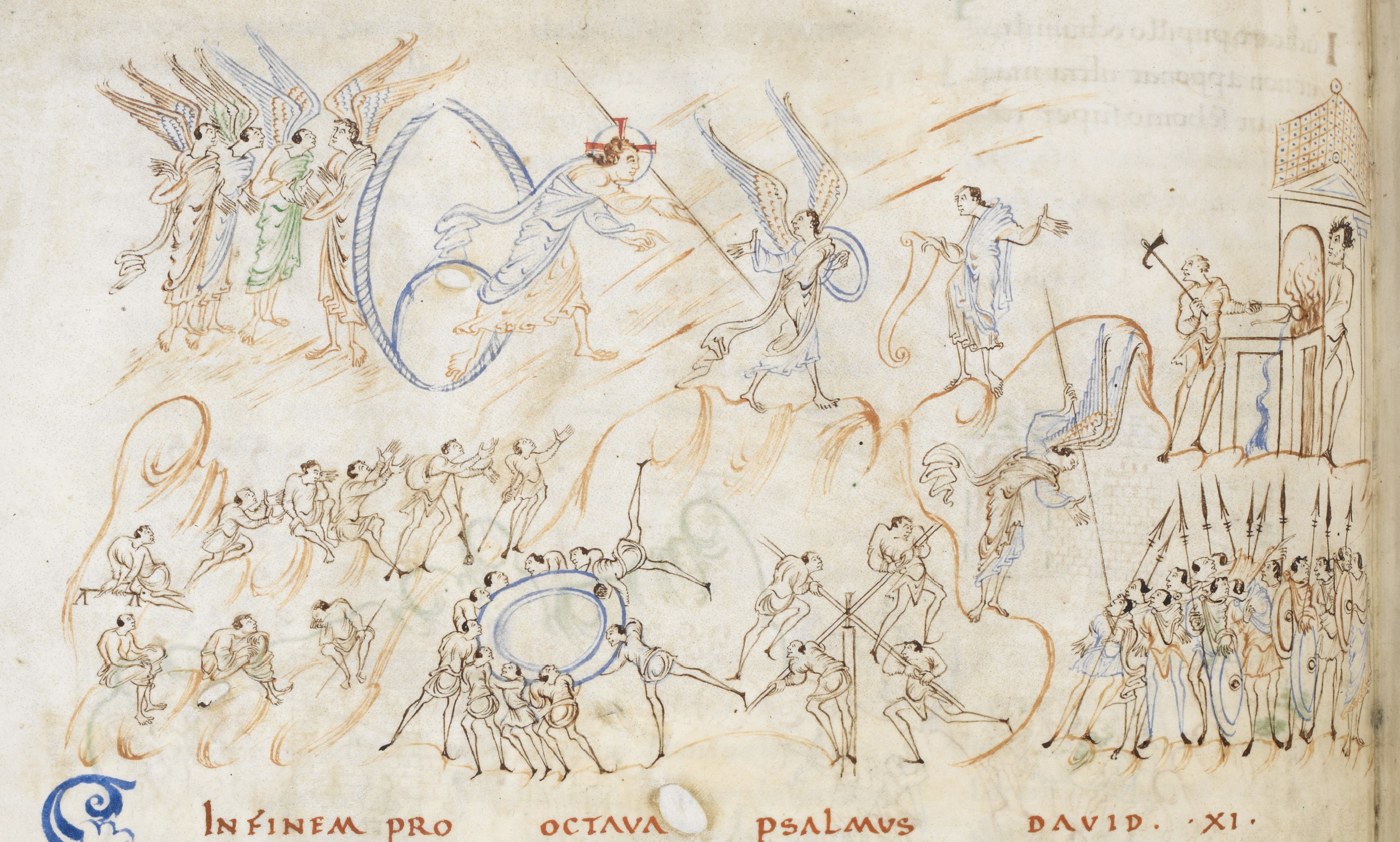
Detail of f.6v

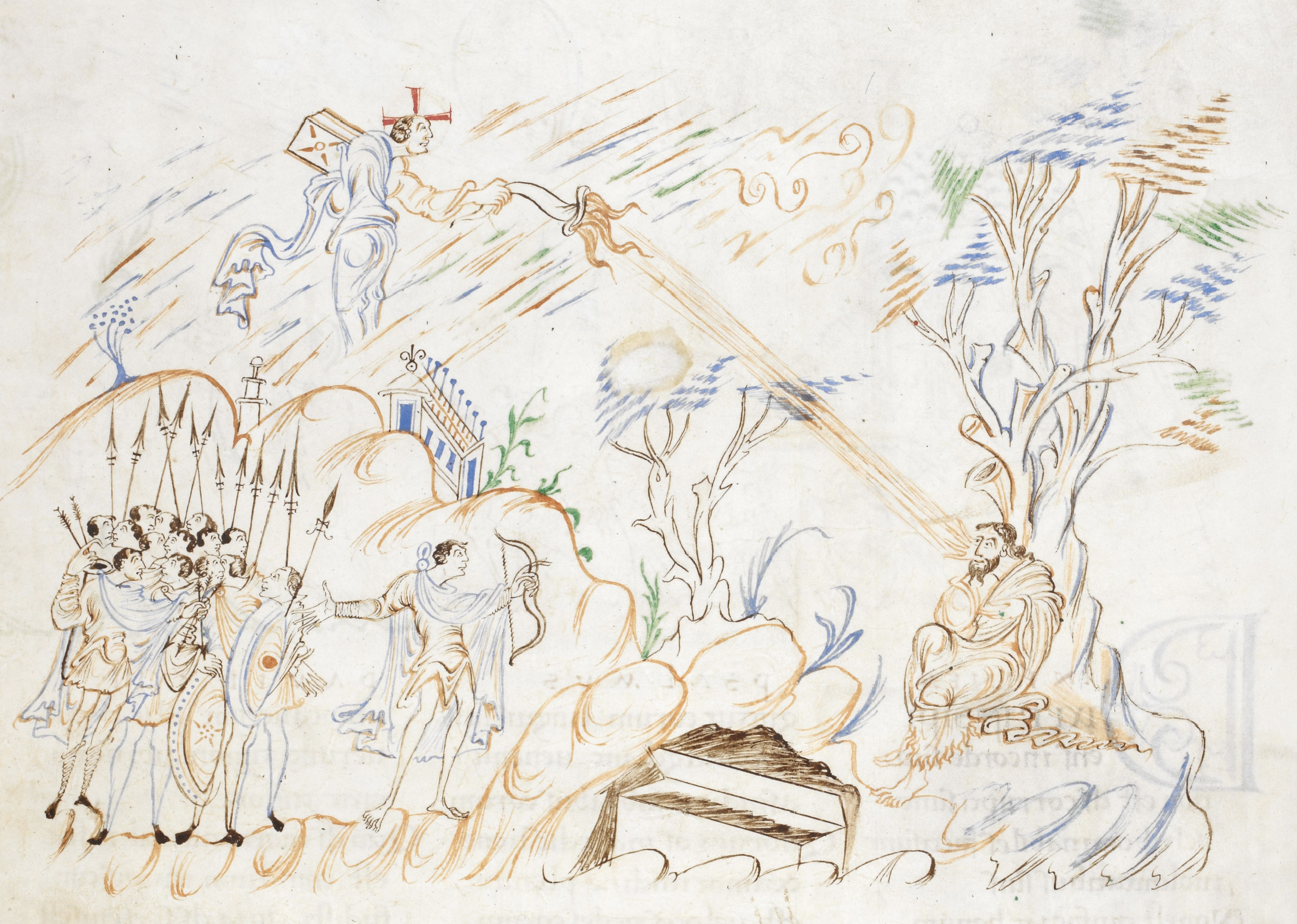
Detail of f.7r

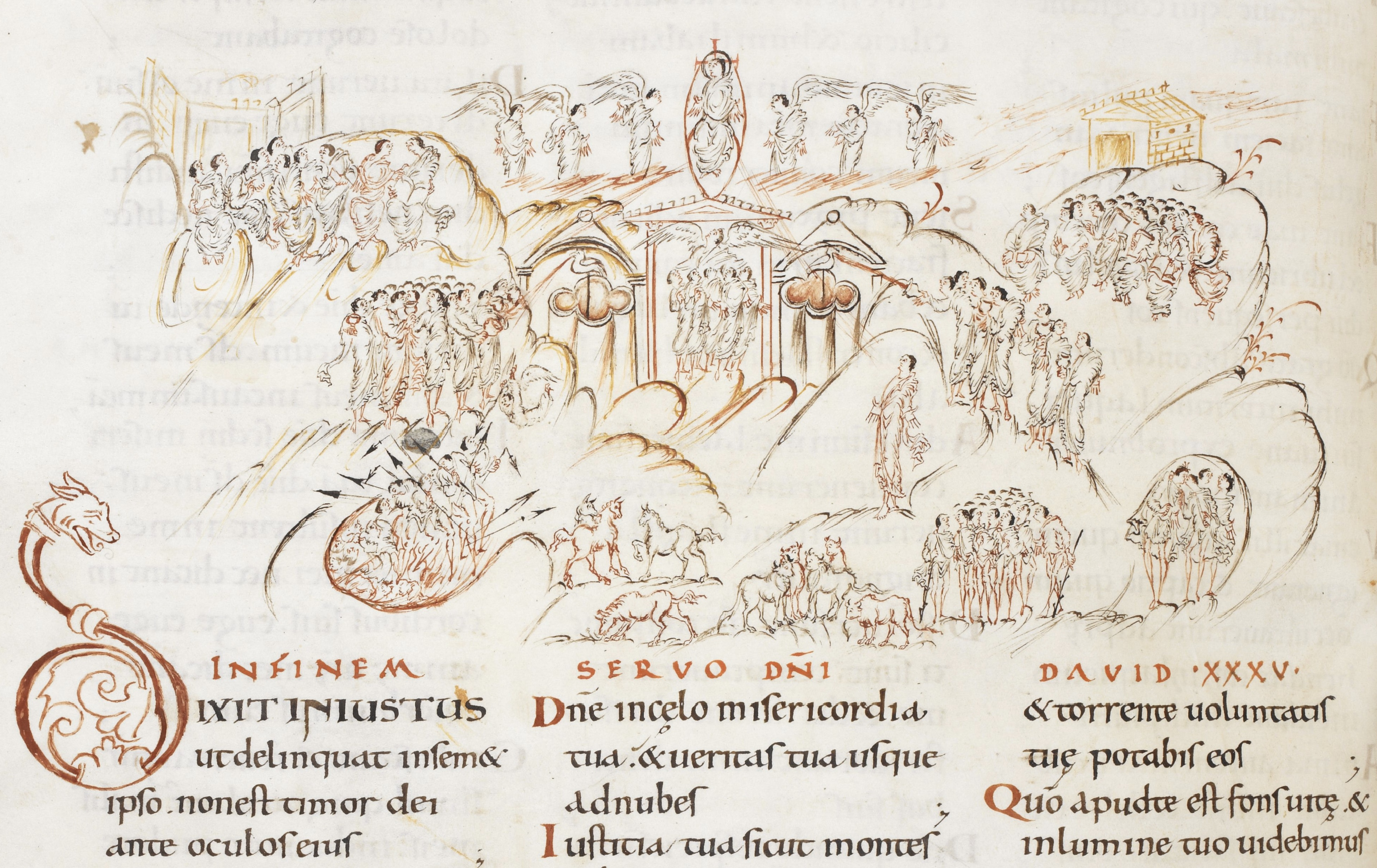
Detail of f.20v

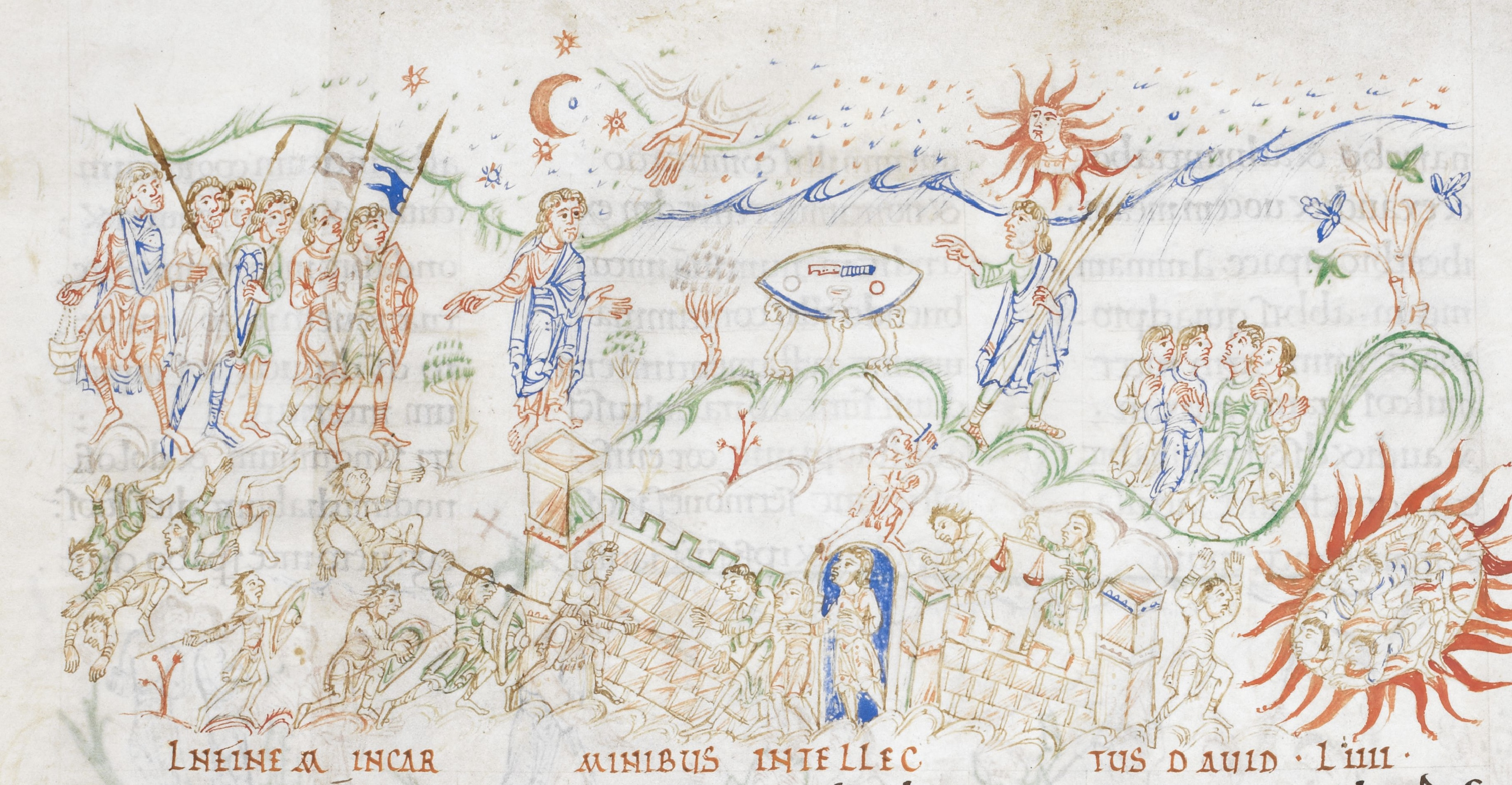
Detail of f.30r

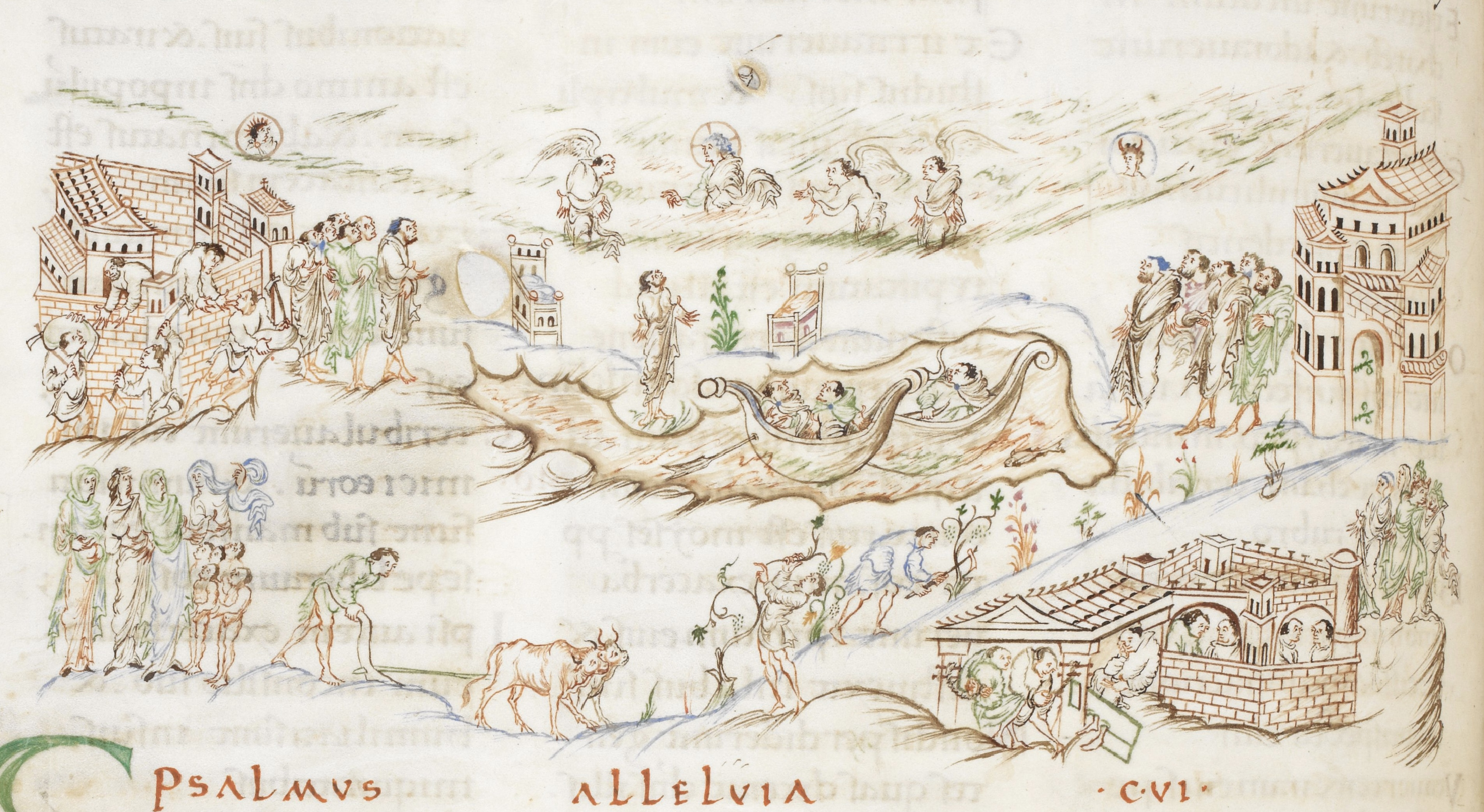
Detail of f.54v

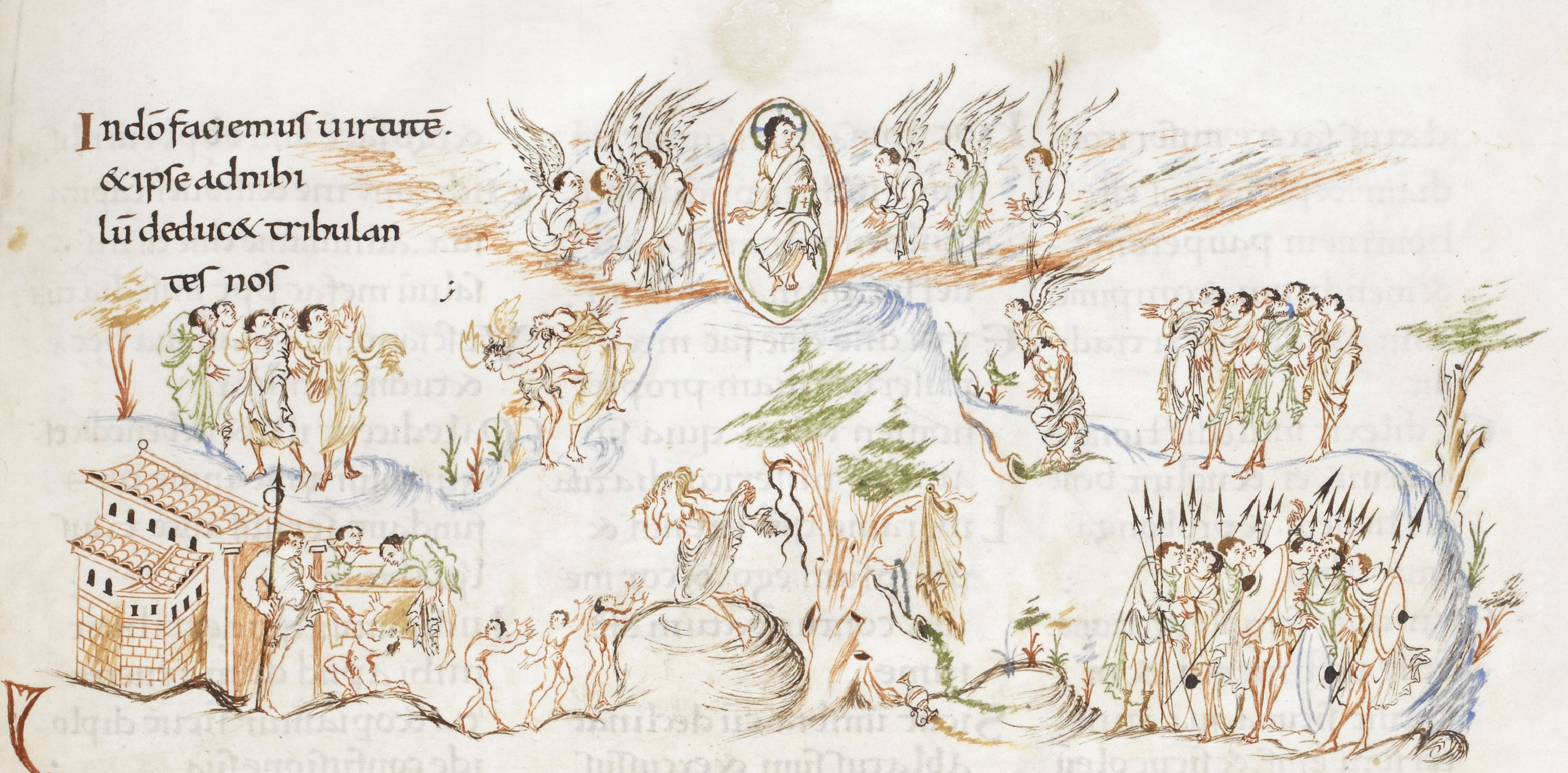
Detail of f.56r

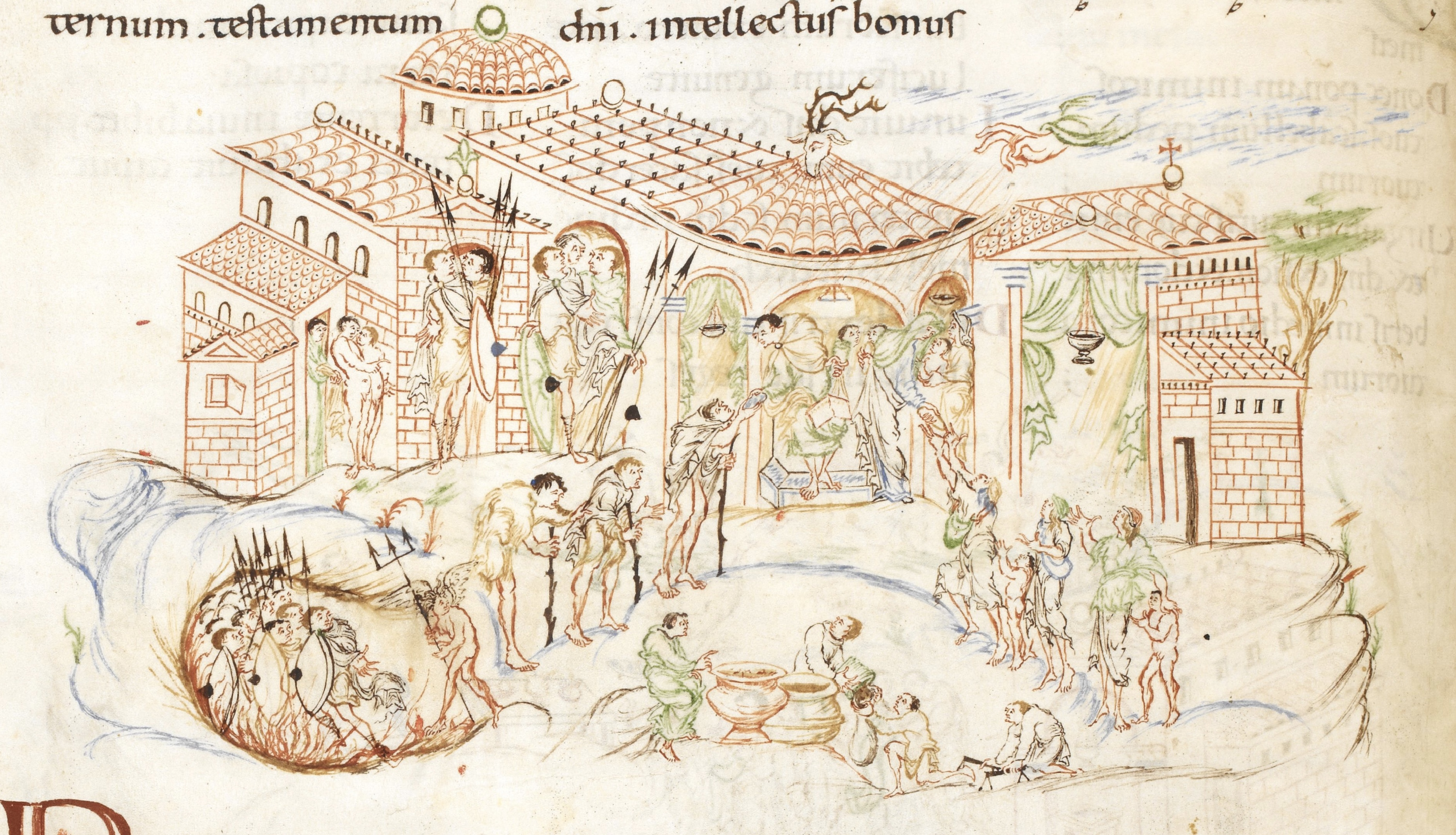
Detail of f.57v

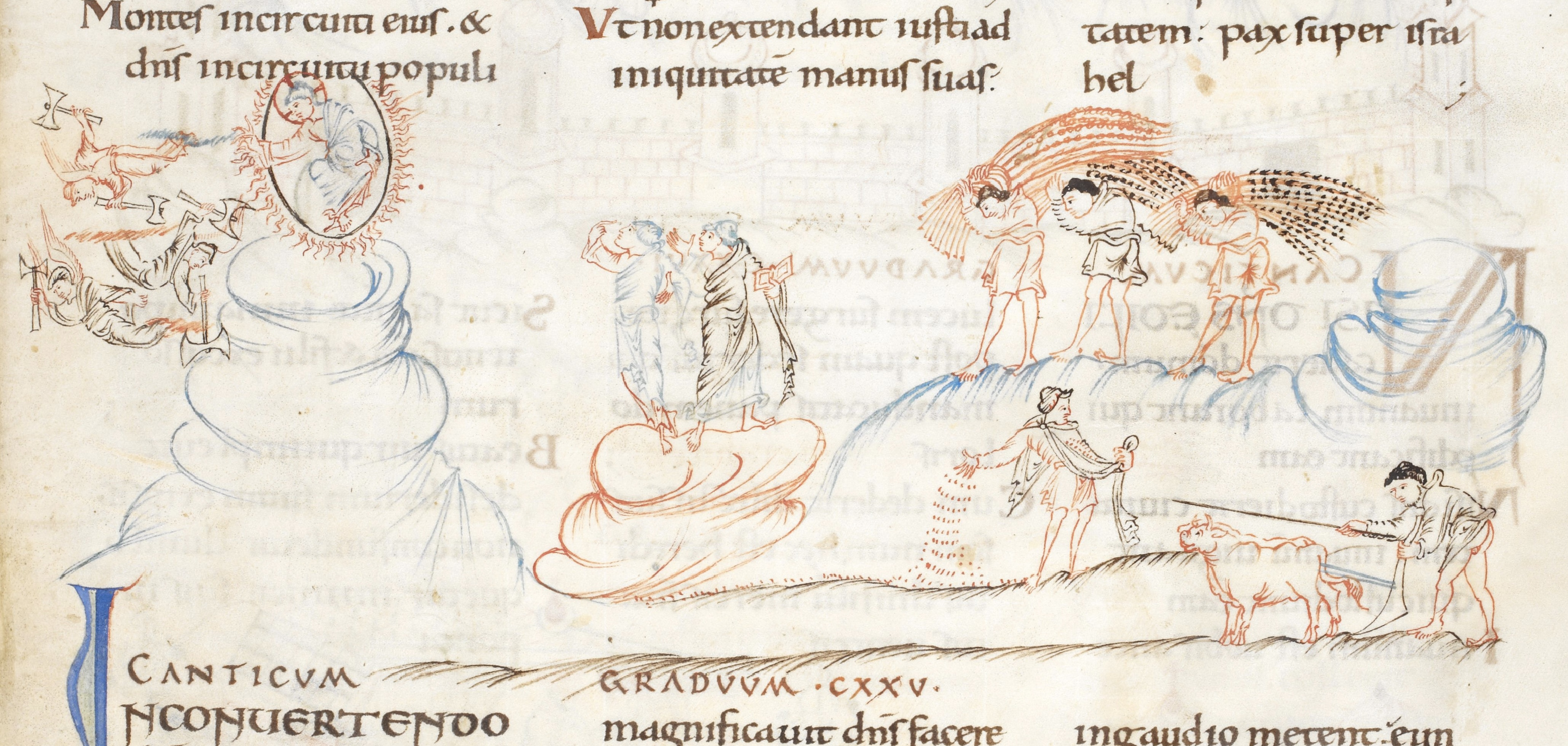
Detail of f.66r

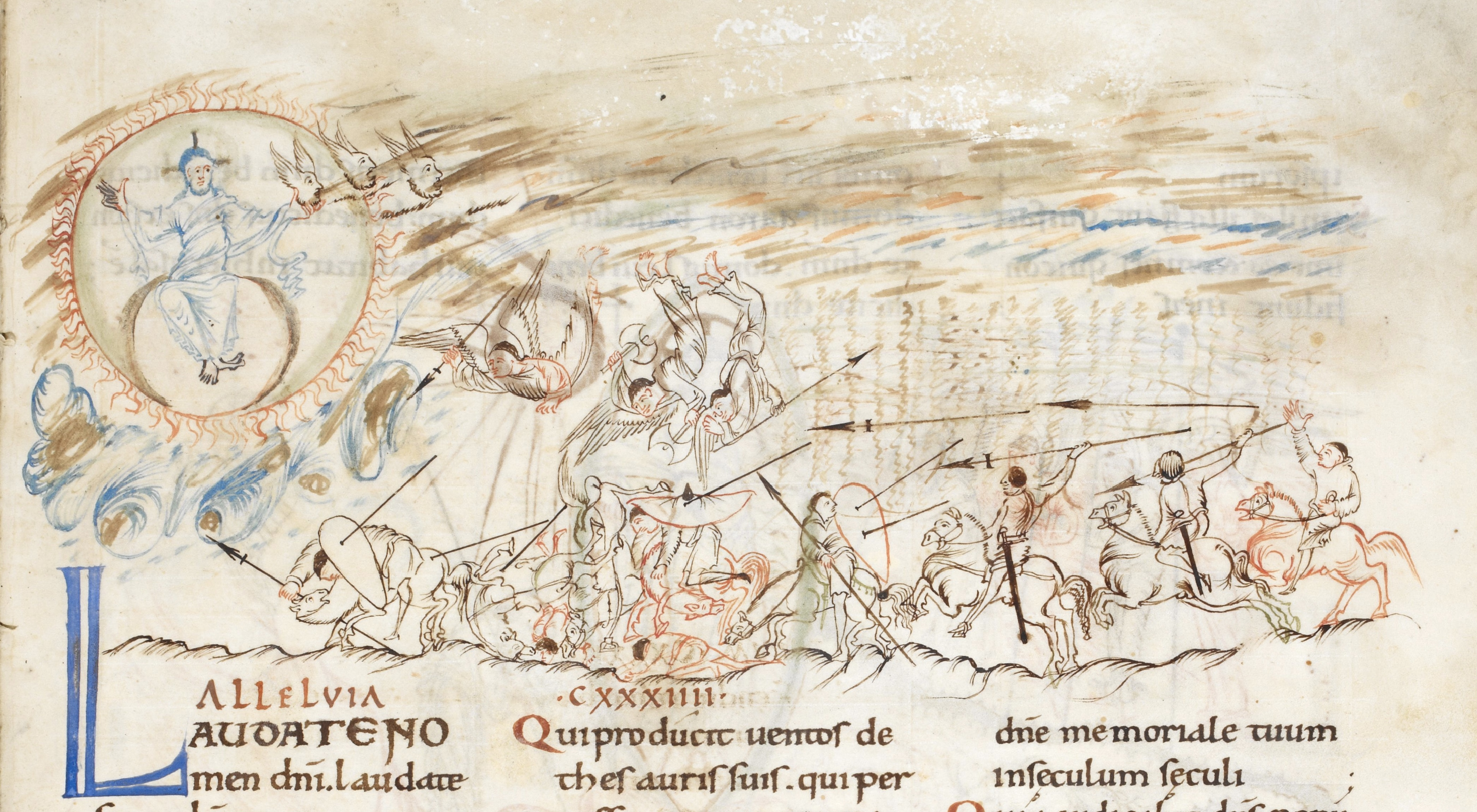
Detail of f.69r

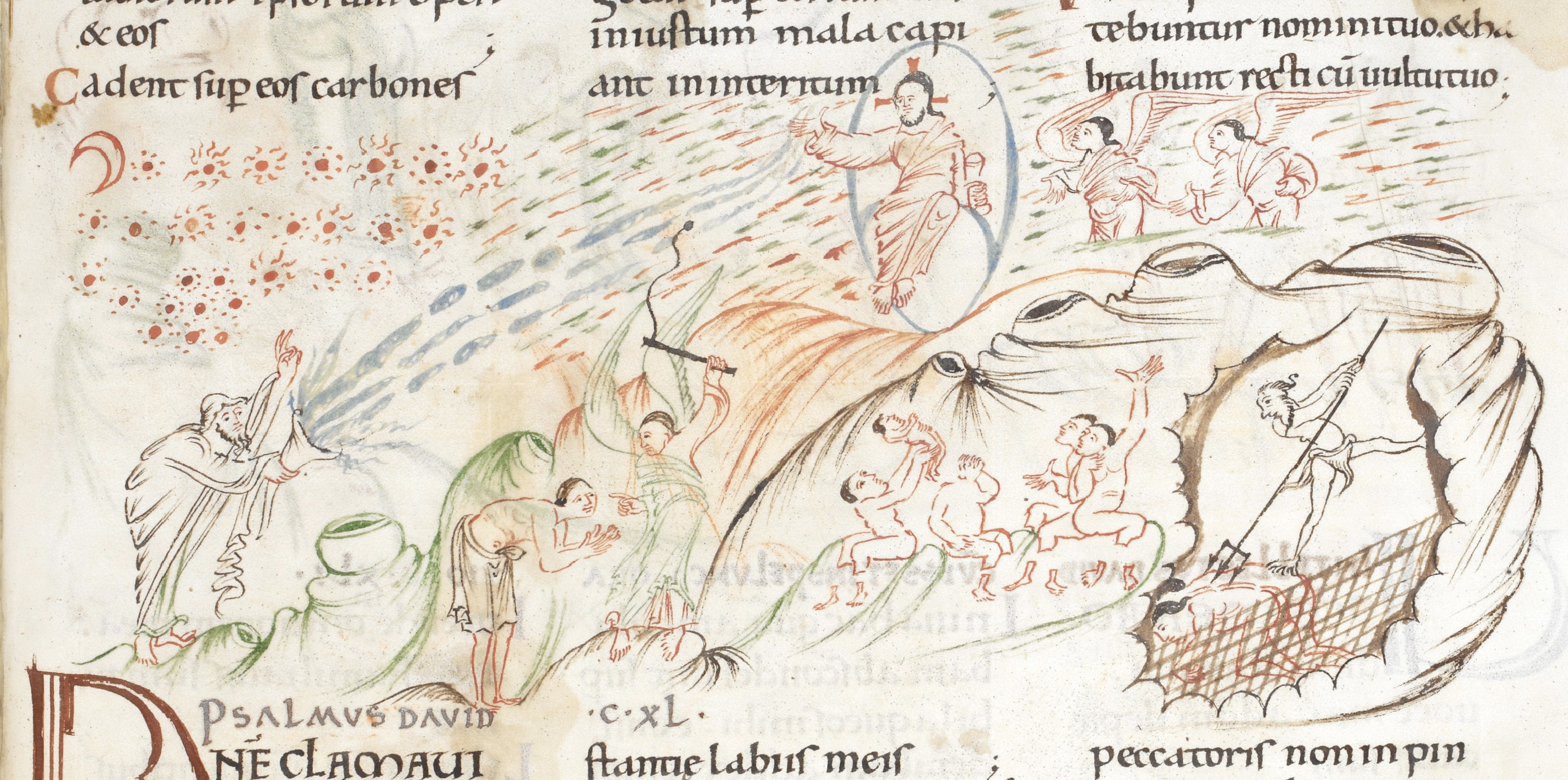
Detail of f.72r
