= Great Canterbury Psalter =

Illuminated manuscript

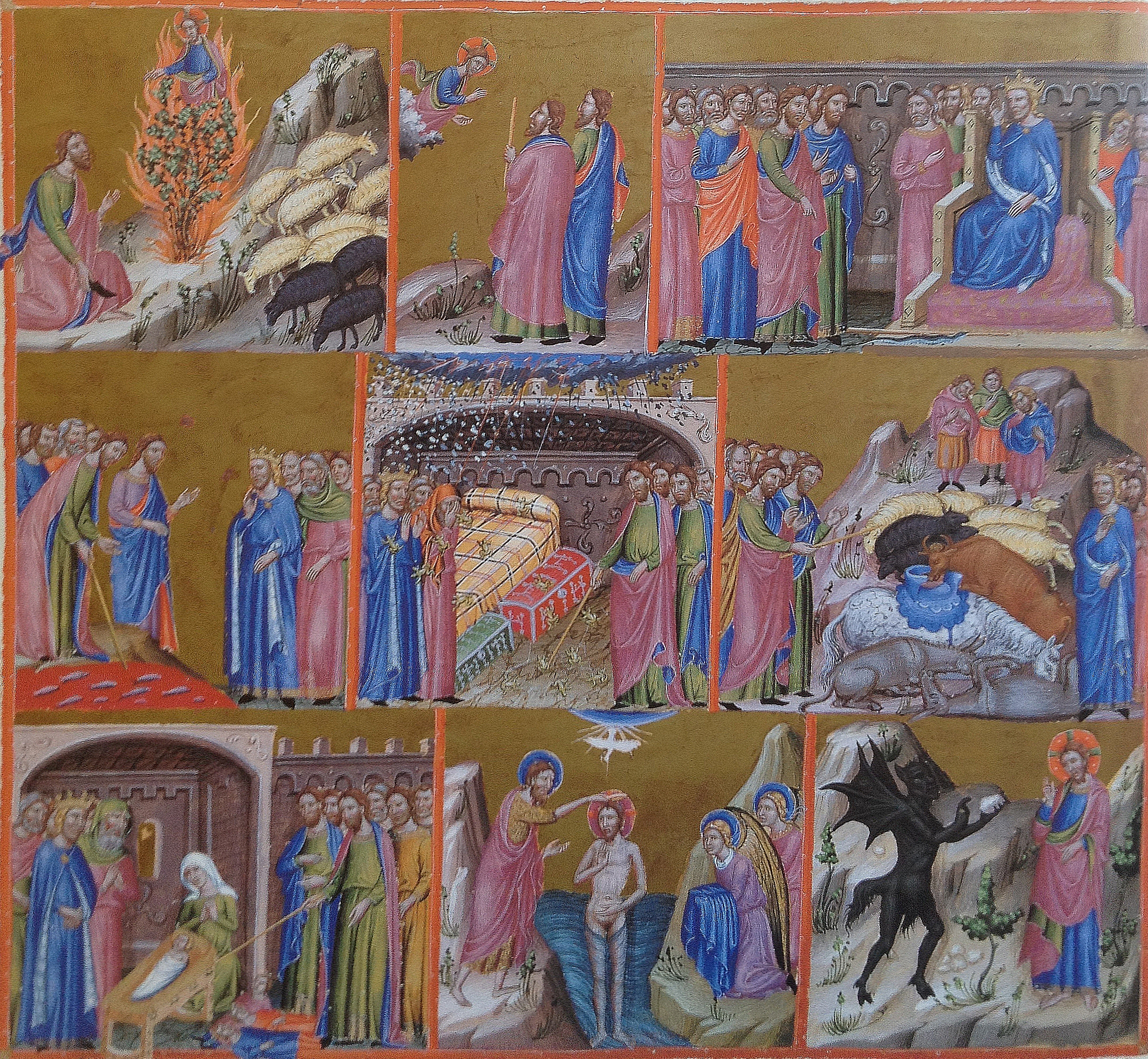
Detail of folio 144v, from the Catalan portion, illustrating Psalm 80

The Great Canterbury Psalter (also called the Anglo-Catalan Psalter or Paris Psalter) is an early 13th- and mid 14th-century illuminated manuscript with the shelfmark MS lat. 8846 in the Bibliothèque nationale de France in Paris. It was made in two different locations and moments in time: at Canterbury around 1200 (184 pages) and in Catalonia around 1340. It is the last of a series of copies of the Utrecht Psalter made in Canterbury, following the Harley Psalter and the Eadwine Psalter.

The English elements are: the main texts, but only taking the Psalms up to Psalm 98; a prefatory cycle of biblical scenes, from both Old and New Testaments, over eight pages, each divided into 12 square compartments (one has 18 medallions instead); illustrations to the Psalms adapting the Utrecht compositions, but only covering most of the psalms up to Psalm 52.

== Canterbury, c. 1200 ==
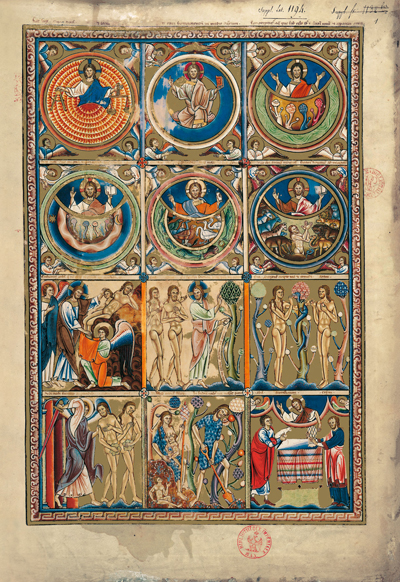
The Great Canterbury Psalter, f. 1r

Henry II rules England. Following his marriage to Eleanor of Aquitaine, his dominions also encompass part of France. In 1170, Thomas Becket, Archbishop of Canterbury, has returned from his exile in France with a series of splendid manuscripts illuminated on the continent which were to influence the style of the scriptorium at Christ Church, Canterbury, the monastery servicing Canterbury Cathedral, then one of the most important centres making illuminated manuscripts in England.

At that time this workshop was a hive of activity thanks to an ambitious project: a triple psalter featuring the Latin, Hebrew and Gallican versions of the Psalms in addition to glosses in Norman French, the French dialect spoken in England for three centuries following the Norman conquest, as the educated language and the one preferred by the court and the upper classes. They copied virtually the whole text in impeccable script, there being no sign of any mistakes or corrections, and illuminated the first part of the codex.

The English masters decided to begin the psalter with paintings intended for an erudite audience. They created four full-page, illuminated folios giving a prologue providing a detailed summary of the history of humanity according to the scriptures. The splendour of the manuscript and the lavish use of gold suggest it may have been a psalter for a king: Henry II himself, Louis VII of France or even Philip Augustus in the early years of his reign. Another candidate of noble birth could be Henry the Lion, duke of Saxony.

The first section follows the iconographic cycle of the Utrecht Psalter. It opens with what Leroquais called the Psalter prologue, consisting of 8 full-page miniatures, and continues with 52 miniatures measuring approximately 15 × 32 cm (width of the page) at the beginning of each Psalm.

The English artists created a universe filled with unusual scenes whose singularity and complex symbolism made them difficult to interpret. The almost dreamlike portrayal of nature, with unreal, imaginary forms, is stunning. The painters endowed the animals with a personality of their own, depicting them with such expressive faces that they sometimes seem to be speaking to each other. The wealth of colours and lavish use of gold make this manuscript highly unusual. However, the English miniaturists' painstaking task was mysteriously interrupted. Something happened to the workshop or the codex that prevented the Canterbury masters from completing the meticulous illumination work they had undertaken.

== Catalonia, c. 1340 ==
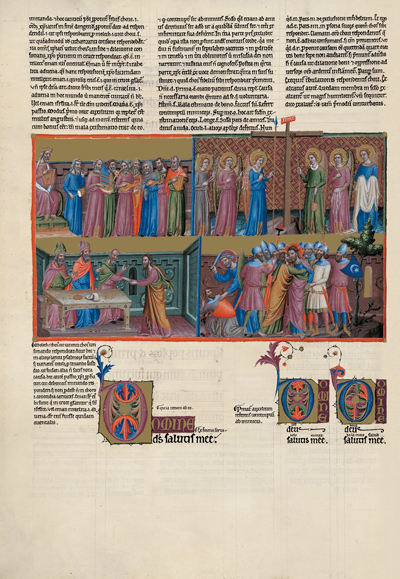
The Great Canterbury Psalter, f. 154v

The pages from 185 on are "characterised by [a] great iconographic freedom", consisting of 46 relatively large miniatures with vividly coloured borders which are divided into compartments. They are the work of painter Ferrer Bassa. The unfinished manuscript was transferred to Catalonia shortly after being made.

Peter IV of Aragon (Pedro the Ceremonious) was crowned king of Aragón in 1336. Bassa had already returned from his journey acquiring knowledge in Tuscany where he had been in contact with the most fertile and creative painting in the Italian Trecento.

Bassa produced several works commissioned by the king in his Barcelona workshop. A splendid psalter of English origin came into his hands, but, for some unknown reason, it was unfinished. The English masters had, however, left sketches for seven miniatures and allocated blank spaces for the rest. It is highly likely that Pedro the Ceremonious insisted on Ferrer Bassa completing this spectacular psalter for him whilst respecting its sumptuous lavishness. Modern-day researchers have found many clues linking its completion to the king himself. The seven paintings drawn by the Canterbury masters and painted by Ferrer Bassa a century later are the result of a unique combination of the Anglo-Byzantine culture close to the 1200 and the pictorial forms of the 1300 Italianate Gothic. They constitute a remarkable fusion of cultures, a hybrid art in which no boundaries of space, time or culture exist. In the second part of the manuscript, Ferrer Bassa's brushstrokes reinterpret the Byzantine dimension of English painting with greater artistic licence, revealing a thorough knowledge of trecentist pictorial resources. Bassa's images convey new ways of structuring space along with more naturalist landscapes.

Ferrer Bassa, considered to be the finest painter in Aragon in the 14th century, developed a personality of his own, clearly marked by the Tuscan styles of the Trecento, particularly those of Florence and Siena with which he was familiar. A painter making a delicate, elegant and refined use of colour. Bassa was the painter of the Catalan-Aragonese royal household and the preferred artist of Alfonso the Kind and Pedro the Ceremonious, who both commissioned him to produce several works for their residences and chapels royal. Most of them were apparently portraits, now missing.

== The Great Canterbury Psalter ==
Two periods, two places, two artistic styles and two workshops for a single manuscript: the Great Canterbury Psalter. Around the year 1200, English art experienced one of its most brilliant periods, a time when the last Romanesque stage, a marked influence of Byzantine art and the beginnings of a new style known as Gothic all came together. This rich, artistic amalgam was to merge, more than a century later, with the finest, Italianate Gothic introduced into the Iberian Peninsula by Ferrer Bassa. The result is a symbiosis between an English painting of the late 12th century and a Catalan painting of the 14th century.

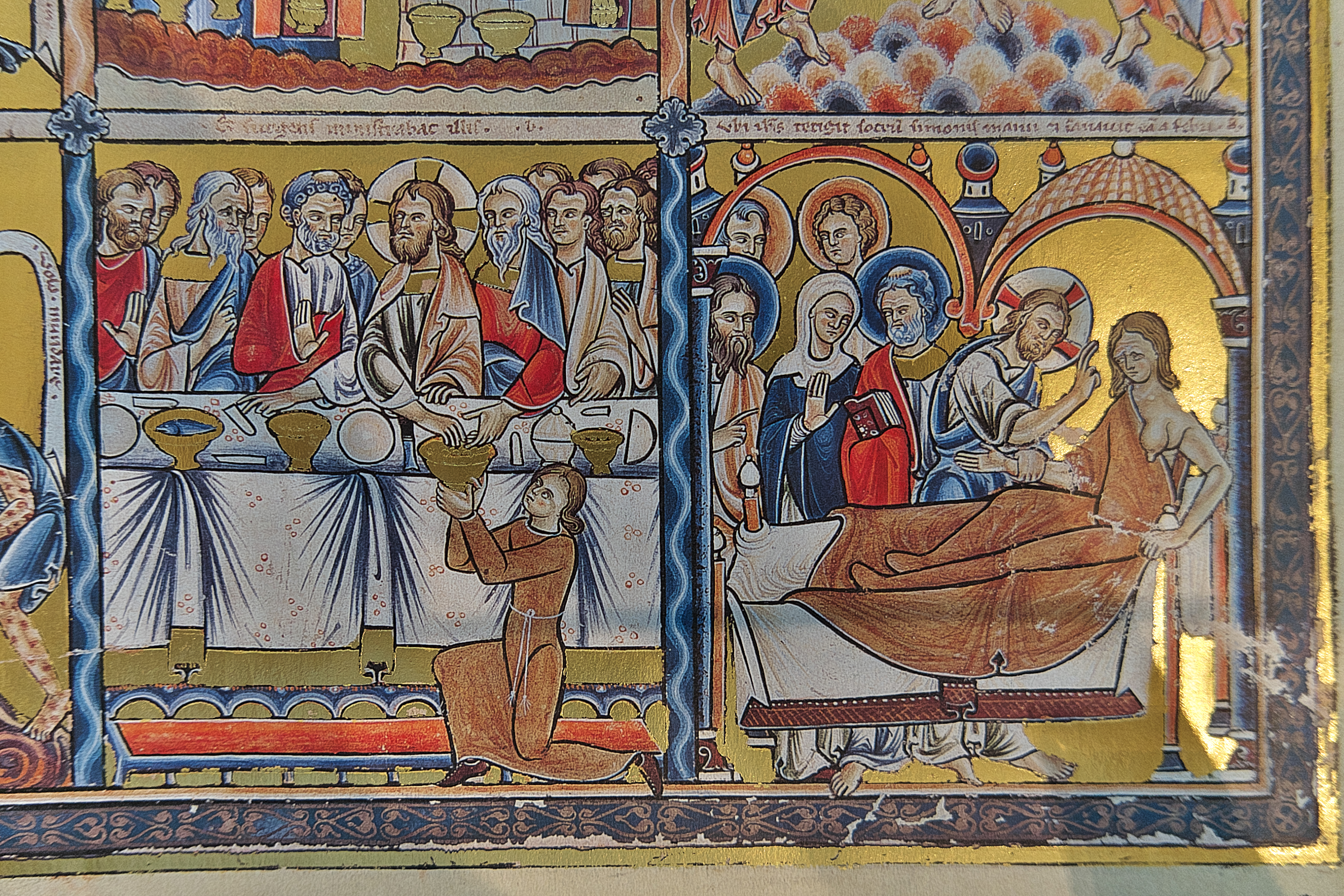
Scenes with the mother-in-law of St. Peter

This convergence of the two different figurative cultures of England and Catalonia, more than 100 years apart, is one of the most important features of the codex, a facet that makes it unique in the history of art. The Great Canterbury Psalter is an essential manuscript for an understanding of medieval European painting. This lavish psalter captivated the leading figures of western history and occupied a place of honour in their libraries. It probably belonged to Jean, duc de Berry and the first European female bibliophile, Margaret of Austria, who bequeathed it to Mary of Hungary, Emperor Charles V's sister. Napoleon Bonaparte removed it from the Burgundian Library in Brussels and took it to Paris in 1796. In 1809 it received the binding featuring Napoleon I's coat of arms that it has retained to the present day.
