= Grimbald Gospels =

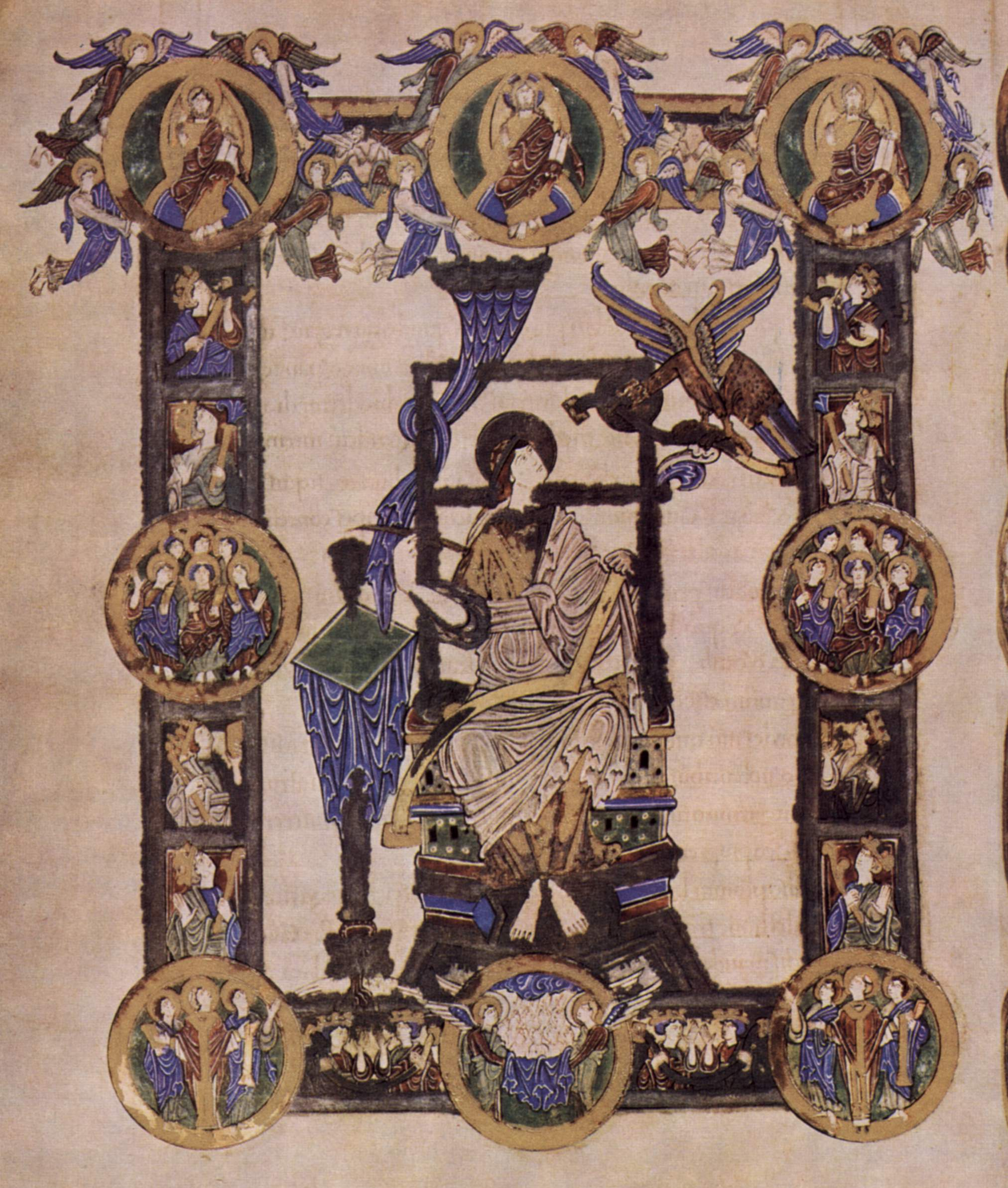
Portrait of Saint John

The Grimbald Gospels (London, British Library, Add. 34890) is an illuminated gospel book created at the monastery attached to Canterbury Cathedral in the period 1012–1023. The scribe of the text was Eadwig Basan. The script is Caroline minuscule. The manuscript combines features of Carolingian illumination and Anglo-Saxon illumination.

== Contents ==
The gospels are preceded in the manuscript by Jerome's preface Plures fuisse qui evangelia scripserunt and by Victor of Capua's preface Cum fortuitu in manus meas; by Jerome's letter to Pope Damasus and Pseudo-Jerome's continuation of the same, Sciendum etiam nequem ignarum; and by Eusebius of Caesarea's letter to Carpianus.

The gospel text is the Latin Vulgate version. Each gospel is accompanied by its standard prologue, a table of contents of its chapters, the Ammonian sections and marginal references to the Eusebian canons. The manuscript closes with a gospel capitulary, a list of readings for the year. A copy of a letter from Archbishop Fulk of Reims to King Alfred the Great was later added. Dating to about 893, the letter is a recommendation of the monk Grimbald of Saint-Bertin, whom Alfred had invited to England.

== Decoration ==
The Grimbald Gospels has initials illuminated in gold throughout. Although silver was extensively used, it has mostly oxidized to silver glance. There are rubrics in red and blue ink and in gold. The manuscript has been analyzed by Raman microscopy and the following pigments identified: iron gall, lazurite, red lead, white lead, verdigris, orpiment, indigo and carbon.

Matthew, Luke and John have full-page evangelist portraits and their gospels begin with large decorated incipits in full-page borders. These features are missing for the gospel of Mark. Since the portraits appear on the verso (back) of one leaf and the incipits on the recto (front) of the following leaf, these are double-page decorations. The portraits are distinctive for the plain background enclosed by an ornate border. The composition of the border of John's portrait is especially unusual. It contains images of the Trinity, the apostles, cherubim, kings, clergy and the souls of the dead. The frame of John's incipit contains a Madonna and Child. The Matthew and Luke borders are filled with acanthus in the "Winchester style".
