= Utrecht Psalter =

Ninth-century illuminated psalter

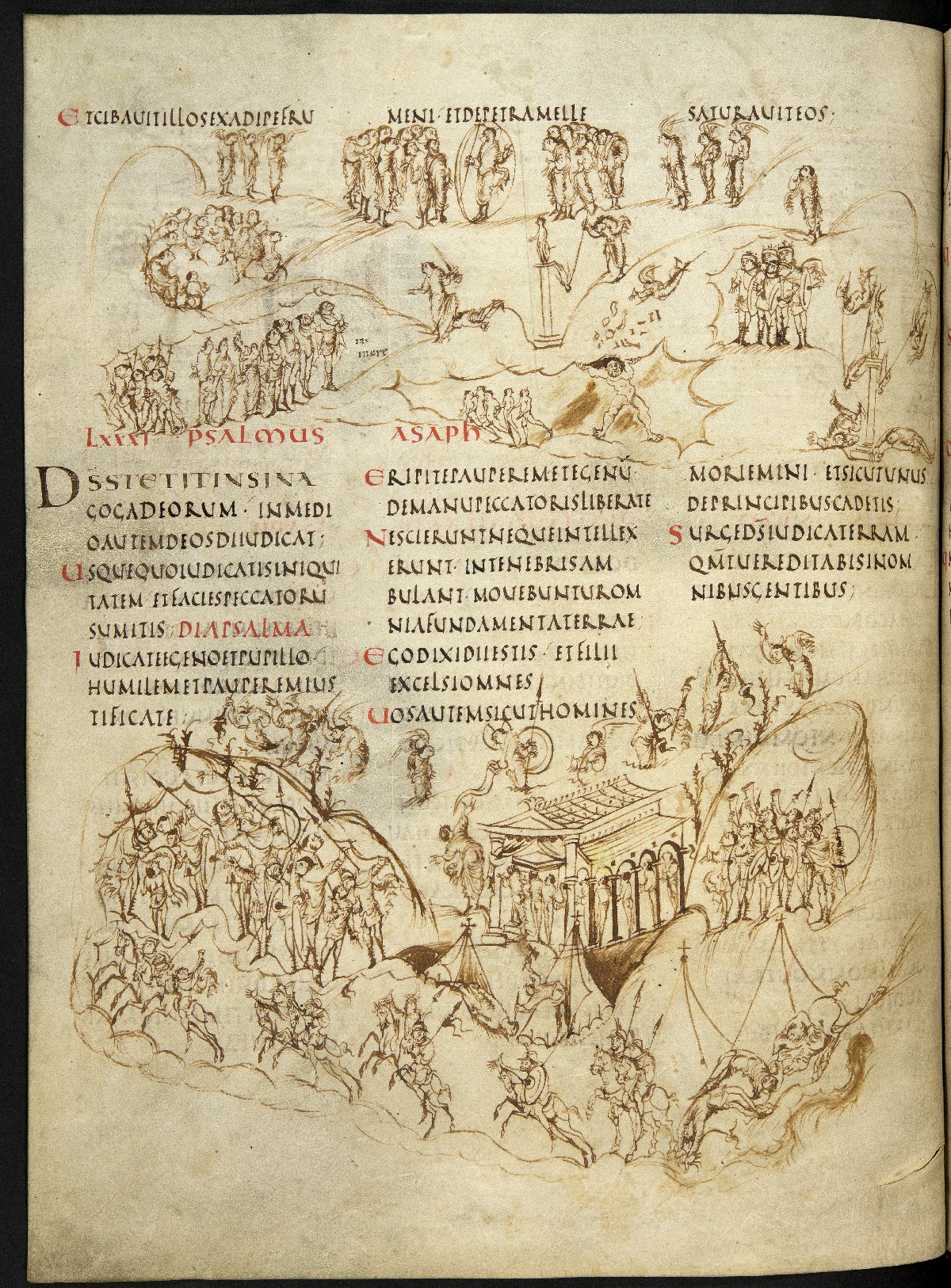
Start of Psalm 81

The Utrecht Psalter (Utrecht, Universiteitsbibliotheek, MS Bibl. Rhenotraiectinae I Nr 32.) is a ninth-century illuminated psalter which is a key masterpiece of Carolingian art; it is probably the most valuable manuscript in the Netherlands. It is famous for its 166 lively pen illustrations, with one accompanying each psalm and the other texts in the manuscript (Chazelle, 1055). The precise purpose of these illustrations, and the extent of their dependence on earlier models, have been matters of art-historical controversy. The psalter spent the period between about 1000 to 1640 in England, where it had a profound influence on Anglo-Saxon art, giving rise to what is known as the "Utrecht style". It was copied at least three times in the Middle Ages. A complete facsimile edition of the psalter was made in 1875 (Lowe, 237), and another in 1984 (Graz).

The other texts in the book include some canticles and hymns used in the office of the hours, including various canticles, the Te Deum and Athanasian Creed. The latter text was the subject of intense study by Thomas Duffus Hardy and others after scholarly interest in the psalter grew in the 19th century.

== History and copies ==
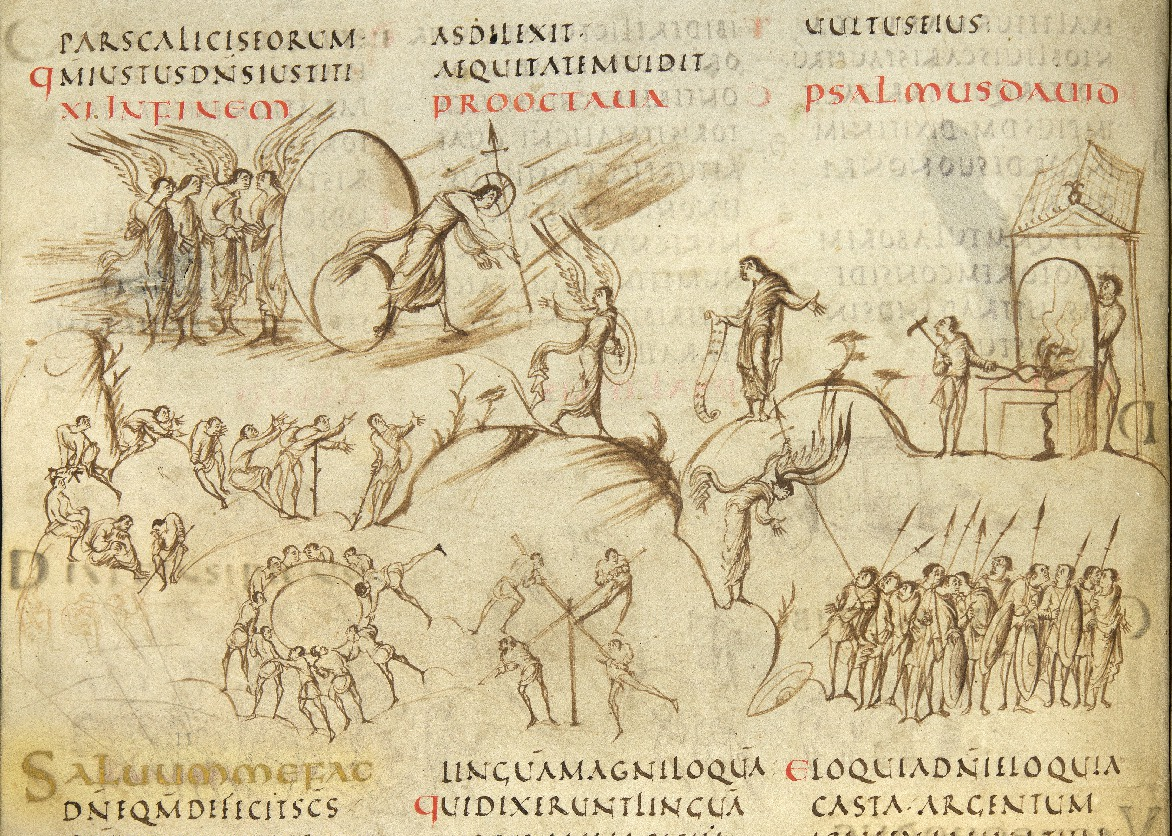
Psalm 11

The entire volume contains 108 vellum leaves, approximately 13 by 10 inches (330 by 250 mm) in size. The pages are formed by quires of 8 pages folded (Birch, 64, 67). There was probably at least an author portrait of David at the start, and the surviving text begins with a large initial with insular-style interlace (picture at top).

The psalter was at one time thought to be a 6th-century work largely because of the use of archaic conventions in the script. The Psalter is written in rustic capitals, a script which by the 9th century had fallen out of favour in Carolingian manuscripts. These are now widely viewed as imitation rustic capitals, and the manuscript is dated no earlier than the 9th century (Lowe, 237). It has been suggested that because of the capitals and the book's size, the Utrecht Psalter was intended as a choir book for several monks to read at the same time while singing; alternatively that it was intended for young monks learning the Psalms by heart in groups, a suggestion that perhaps better explains the amount of illustration. The psalter is believed to have been made near Reims, as its style is similar to that of the Ebbo Gospels (Benson, 23). It may have been sponsored by Ebbo, Archbishop of Reims, and so is usually dated between 816 and 835. Others have argued for a date c. 850, saying that the psalm illustrations draw from the travels of Gottschalk of Orbais, and the illustration with the Athanasian Creed and other details pertain more to Ebbo's successor, Hincmar (Chazelle, 1058, 1068, 1073).

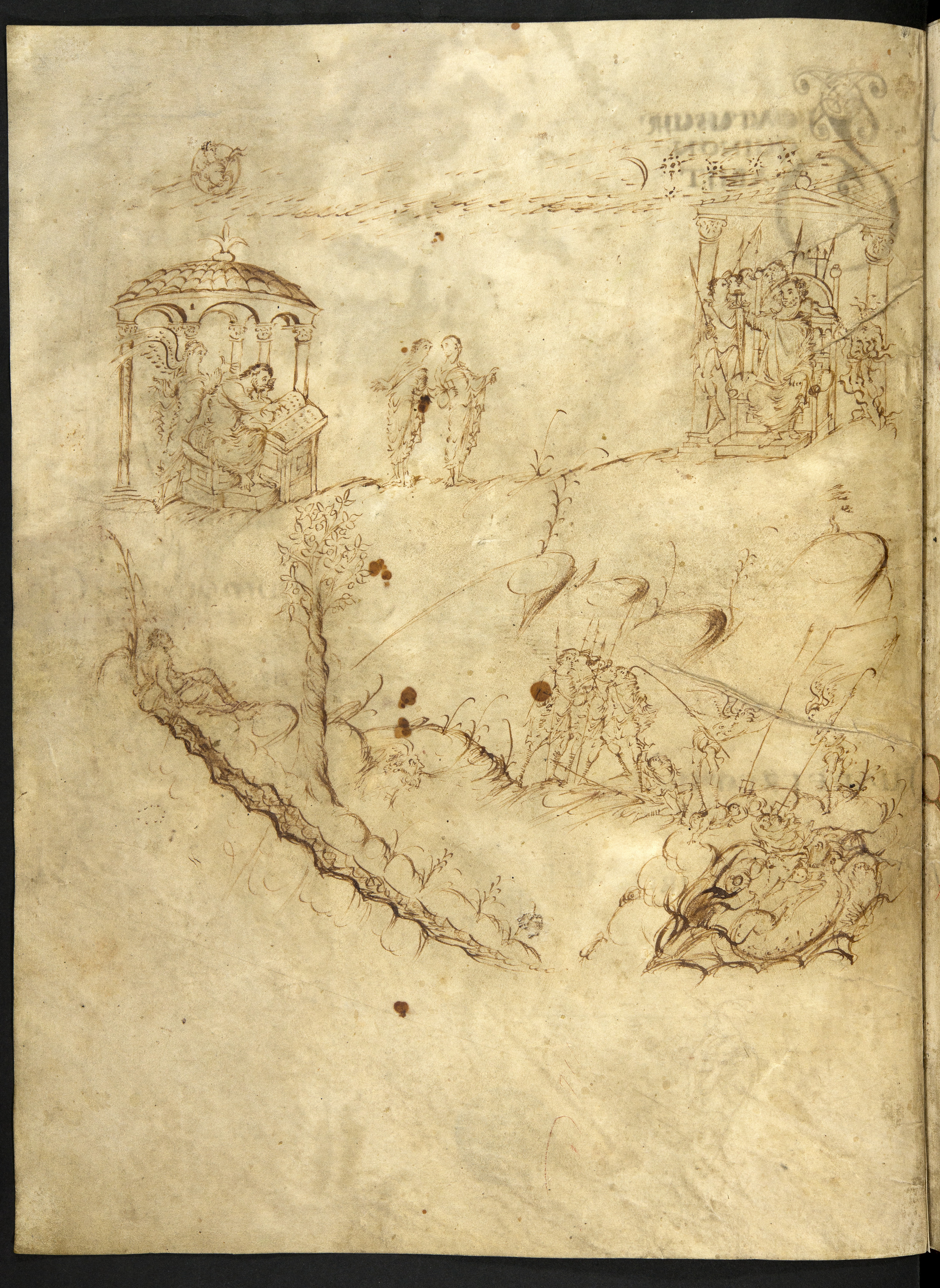
Beginning of the Utrecht Psalter

A period spent in the late 9th century in the area of Metz, perhaps at the court of Charles the Bald, has been suggested on the basis of apparent influences from the manuscript in the art of the area. The manuscript had reached Canterbury Cathedral by c. 1000, at which time a copy began to be made of it; this, the Harley Psalter, is in the British Library as MS Harley 603 (Benson, 14). The Psalter was copied in full three times in the Middle Ages, the second copy being the Eadwine Psalter (Trinity College, Cambridge, MS R.17.1) of 1155–60, with additions 1160–70, and the texts extended to five versions of each psalm. The last copy is a fine version in full colour with gold backgrounds that is known as the "Anglo-Catalan Psalter" or MS Lat. 8846 in the BnF, of 1180-90 (Morgan, 47–9). This was half-illustrated by an English artist in about 1180–1200, and completed by a Catalan artist in 1340–50, naturally using a different Gothic style. The images are necessarily somewhat simplified, and the number of figures reduced.

Earlier there were derivative works in other media; similar groups of figures appear in a Carolingian engraved crystal in the British Museum (the Lothair Crystal, stylistically very different) and metalwork, and some late Carolingian ivories repeat figure compositions found in the Utrecht psalter (Calkins, 211).

The original manuscript spent at least two centuries at Canterbury from the year 1000, and after the English Dissolution of the Monasteries (Canterbury was a monastic cathedral) came into the possession of Robert Bruce Cotton, the famous English antiquary, at which point it was rebound, with his arms on the cover. Cotton lent the manuscript to the great collector Thomas Howard, Earl of Arundel, who took it into exile with him during the English Civil War; it was taken to the Netherlands in around 1642 and sold on Howard's death by his widow and son. It reached Utrecht University in 1716, at which point it was incorporated into the University Library. It was rediscovered in the library in 1858 (Benson, 13).

Comparison of Utrecht and Eadwine Psalters
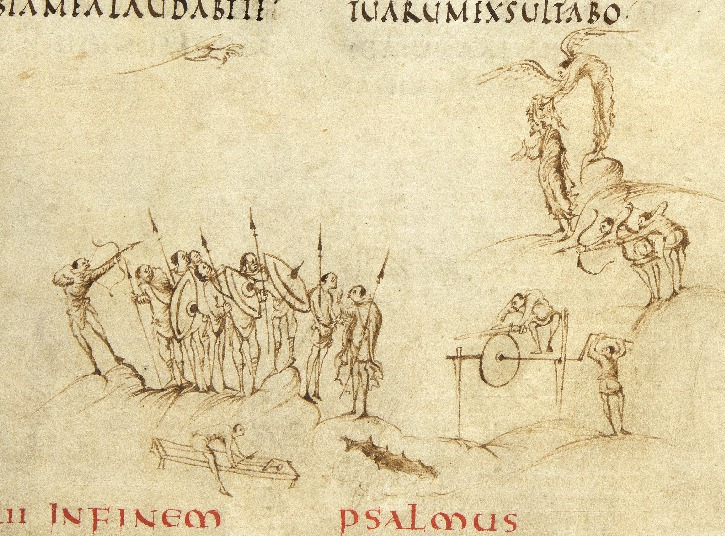
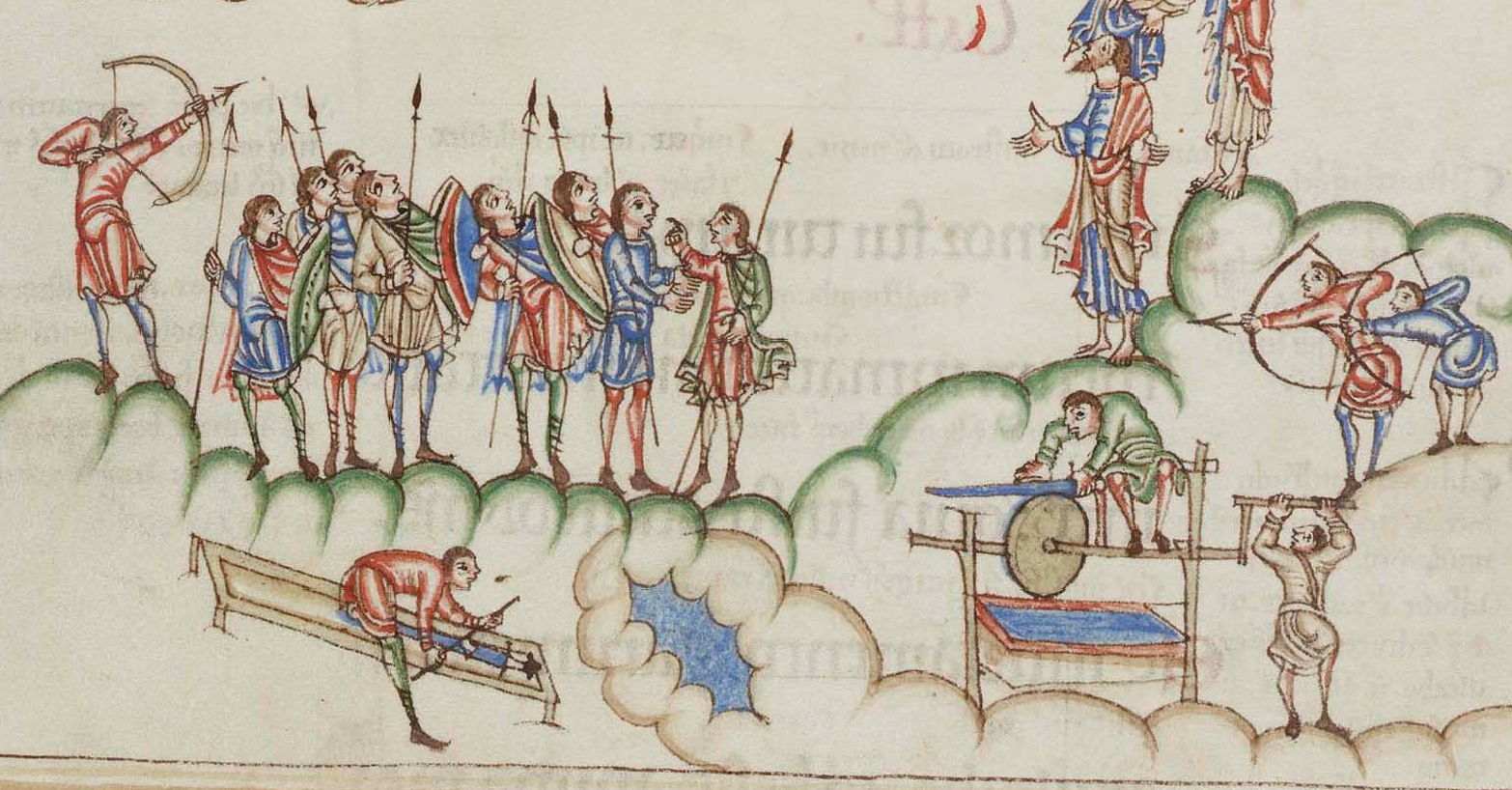
One of the illustrations in the Utrecht Psalter (left) copied in the Eadwine Psalter (right). Psalm 63 (Vulg.), 64 (AV): "Exaudi, Deus...". Eadwine, folio 108v. The psalm begins (NIV): "Hear me, my God, as I voice my complaint; protect my life from the threat of the enemy. 2 Hide me from the conspiracy of the wicked, from the plots of evildoers. 3 They sharpen their tongues like swords and aim cruel words like deadly arrows." The literal rendering of metaphor is a characteristic of the Utrecht tradition of illustration.

== Illumination ==
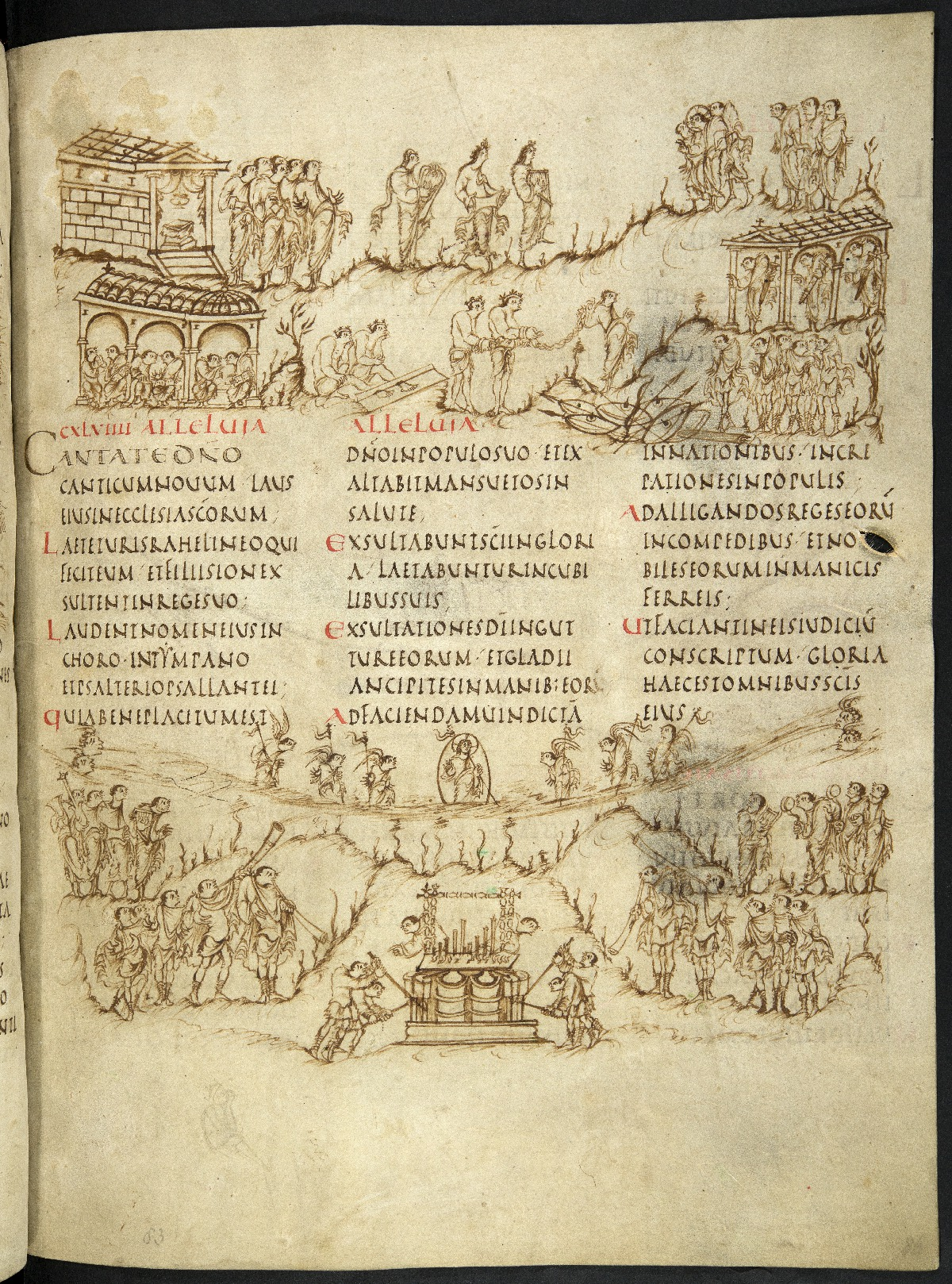
Another page

The Utrecht Psalter is lavishly illustrated with lively pen and ink drawings for each psalm. The miniatures consist of outline drawings in plain bistre, a technique which gained popularity in the Carolingian Renaissance; it was cheaper than full coloured illustrations and quicker to produce. However the Gospel book still remained the main focus of illumination at this period, and the Utrecht Psalter is highly unusual both in the number of illustrations, their size, and the large groups of small figures they contain.

The Utrecht Psalter is important to the development of Anglo-Saxon art in the late tenth century, as the artistic style of its artwork seems to have been drawn on and adapted by Anglo-Saxon artists of this time (Pächt, 172). Although it is hardly likely that this single manuscript was solely responsible for beginning an entire new phase, the style which developed from it is sometimes known as the 'Utrecht' style of outline drawing, and survived almost unchanged into the 1020s (Wormald).

The style of the outline drawings is dramatic, marked by activity, leaping creatures and fluttering folds of drapery set in faintly sketched landscape backgrounds stretching the full span of a page. Unlike traditional medieval Psalter decoration, which focused on general narrative or symbolic aspects of the texts, the Utrecht Psalter provides a very literal, concrete depiction of every line of the text for each Psalm, all combined into one elaborate scene which directly precedes the psalm it illustrates. The purpose of this unusual mode of illustration is unclear. Some have argued it was designed to enable easier memorization of the psalm texts by associating every line with a striking image, in accordance with classical and medieval mnemonic arts (Gibson-Wood, 12–15). However, these composite images sometimes go beyond a purely literal reading of the text, incorporating New Testament scenes or motifs from Christian iconography (Pächt, 168–170). Despite the individuality of the style, the hands of eight different artists have been detected.

The Psalter is the earliest and most fully illustrated of a "narrative" group of Carolingian Psalters and other manuscripts; the much greater freedom of their illustrations may represent a different, probably monastic, audience for them from the more hieratic productions for the court and the altar. Images are unframed, often varied and original in iconography, showing a "liveliness of mind and independence of convention" not found in the more formal books (Hinks, 117). Other members of the group are the Golden Psalter of St. Gall and the Drogo Sacramentary, which made the important innovation of placing most illustrations in inhabited initials. The Byzantine Chludov Psalter represents a comparable tradition in the East (Hinks, 115–119), and the Reims style was also influenced by artists fleeing Byzantine iconoclasm (Berenson, 163).

Meyer Schapiro is among those who have proposed that the Psalter copied illustrations from a Late Antique manuscript; apart from an original perhaps of the 4th or 5th centuries, details of the iconography led him to believe in an intermediary "Latin model" of after about 700 (Shapiro, 77, 110 and passim). That the miniatures are in large part based on an earlier manuscript, initially disputed by some (Tselos, 334 etc.), seems to have gained general acceptance, though the precise nature and dates of earlier postulated versions vary.

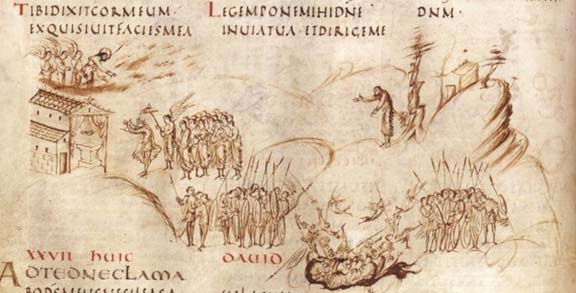
Folio 15b illustrates Psalm 27

The illustration for Psalm 27 centers on they "that go down into the pit". Winged figures poke the "workers of iniquity" with spears. On the left a king stands before a temple; Christ and his angels are shown above. The umbrella held over the king was considered strong evidence that the manuscript was not produced by an Anglo-Saxon artist (Birch, 232).

The illustration for Psalm 115 shows a crucifixion with a chalice catching the blood flowing from the side of Christ. The earliest known comparable images are a miniature from the Drogo Sacramentary (dated 840–855), and an ivory from the Pericopes of Henry II (dated 840–870). This illustration leads to one argument for a later date for the Utrecht Psalter, because dating the illustration before about 835 would make it substantially predate other extant Carolingian examples of this theme (Chazelle, 1072).

According to Getrud Schiller, the manuscript has the first Western images to show Christ dead on the cross, with eyes closed, though it must be said it is hard to tell from such small drawings.

== Additional texts ==
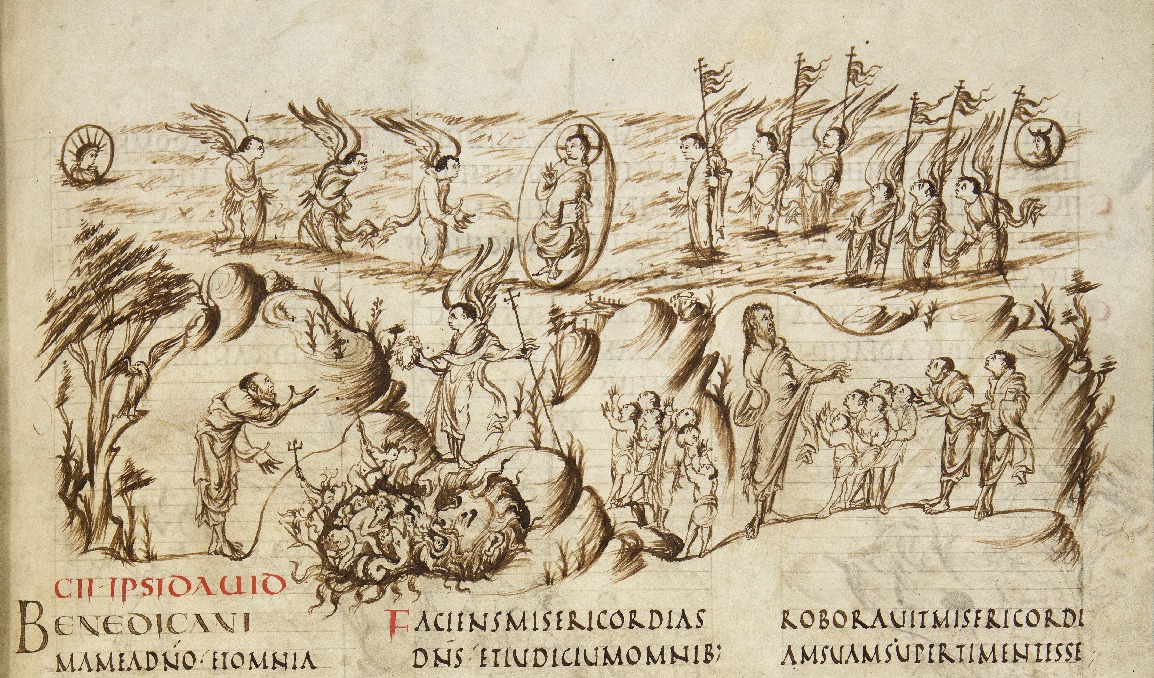
Start of Psalm 102

After the Psalms, like many psalters the manuscript includes various canticles and other material, including the Canticles of Isaiah the Prophet (Is 12 and Is 38), and a third Canticle of Isaiah (1 Samuel 2:1–10). The canticle of Moses the Prophet (Ex 15:1–13) includes 17-20 added on the lower margin. The canticle of Habakkuk (Hab 3) follows with the canticle of Moses to the children of Israel (Deut 32:1–43). The following canticle is the blessing of the three children, then the Te Deum attributed to St. Ambrose of Milan, the Benedictus of Zachary (Luke 1:68–79) with a nativity group, and the Magnificat (Luke 1:46–55). The Magnificat is accompanied by an illustration of the Virgin holding a small child which is not the child Jesus, but a representation of her "spirit" (exultavit spiritus meus). The Nunc Dimittis (Luke 2:29–32) folio includes the Gloria in Excelsis. Next follows the “Oratio Dominica secundum Matheum” (Matt 6:9–13), with the Apostles' Creed on the same folio. In the illustration for the creed, the Virgin holds the child Jesus with a cruciform halo.

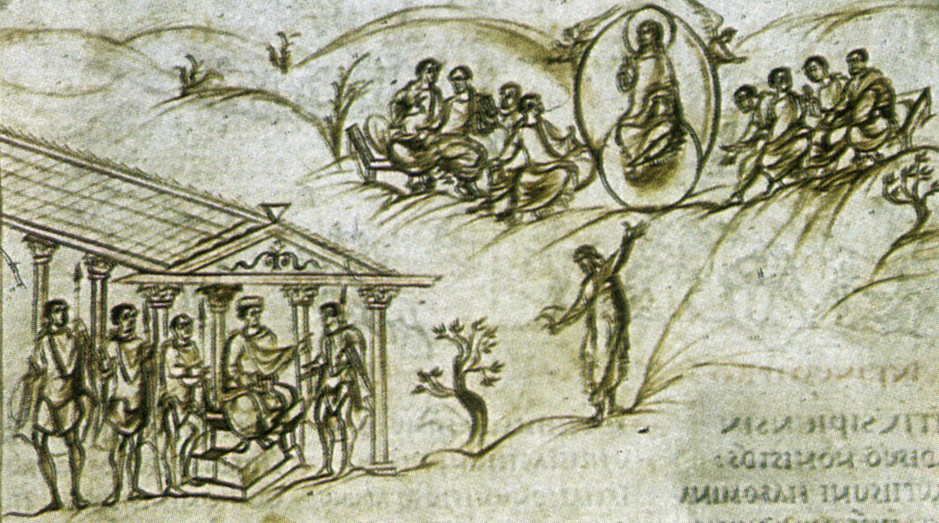
Example of the drawings from Folio 30

Next comes the Athanasian Creed. The illustration appears to be a group of churchmen, with a central figure wearing the pallium of an archbishop. This need not be Athanasius at the Council of Nicea; it may also be Ebbo, or it may represent an archbishop generically as personifying the doctrinal orthodoxy of a creed. The psalter's creed had been mentioned by James Ussher in his 1647 De Symbolis when the manuscript was part of the Cotton library, but it was gone by 1723 (Vinton, 161). When the psalter was rediscovered again in the 19th century, it was thought to be the oldest manuscript containing the Latin text of the creed (Schaff, 70), as some thought the psalter dated from the 6th century. The oldest manuscripts of the Athanasian creed date from the late 8th century (Chazelle, 1056). After this is the "Apocryphal psalm", Psalm 151.

The Psalter is bound with 12 leaves of a different Gospel book written in uncial characters with a text similar to the Codex Amiatinus. These leaves date from around 700 and show characteristics typical of an Anglo-Saxon scribe (Lowe, 273), and is the only other text identified as by the same scribe as the St Cuthbert Gospel, working at Monkwearmouth-Jarrow Abbey (T. Julian Brown, Stonyhurst Gospel, 7–10). The psalter was at one time also bound with the Reculver charter (Birch, 77), but this was later removed (Benson, 14). Robert Cotton may have bound them together due to their similar folio size.

== Recognition ==
In 2015, UNESCO added the psalter to its Memory of the World International Register, recognising it as documentary heritage of global importance.
