= Eadwig Basan =

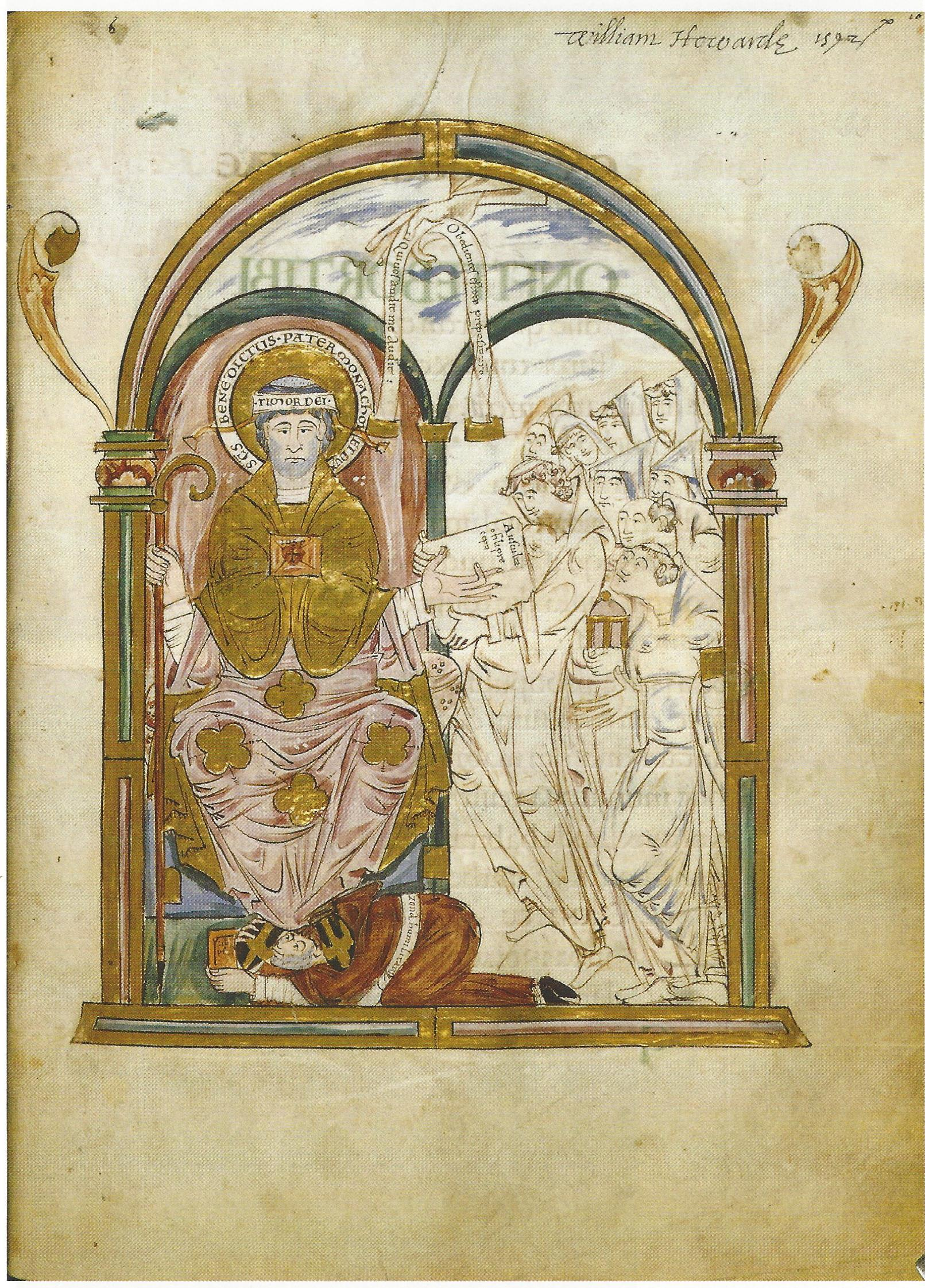
Portrait of Eadwig from the Eadwig Psalter

Eadwig Basan (Latin: Eaduuius Basan) was an eleventh-century monk and scribe of Christ Church Canterbury, who worked on several manuscripts, including the Eadwig Gospels and Eadwig Psalter, both of which were named after him, and the Grimbald Gospels. He also made additions to the York Gospels, the Harley Psalter and the famous Vespasian Psalter, as well as writing several charters in the second and third decades of the eleventh century. It seems that many of his works have a common artist, which has led to the suggestion that he illustrated his manuscripts personally, although this cannot be verified; possibly he is represented by the figure of an anonymous monk kneeling at the feet of St Benedict in a miniature from the Eadwig Gospels. However, it is more likely that this monk was copied from a manuscript by Rabanus Maurus.
