= John Gunn (Scottish writer) =

Scottish cellist & writer (c.1765–c.1824)

John Gunn (c. 1765 – c. 1824) was a Scottish cellist, writer on music, and professor.

== Life ==
Gunn was born in Edinburgh about 1765. Gunn taught violoncello and flute in Cambridge. He wrote at Cambridge his Treatise on the Origin of Stringed Instruments, and published it with his Theory and Practice of Fingering the Violoncello, with Examples, about 1789. Forty favourite Scotch Airs adapted for Violin, Violoncello, or Flute followed as a supplement to that work. In 1790 Gunn translated from the Italian A. D. R. Borghese's New and General System of Music (originally published in French, 1788, Paris).

From 1789 he was in London for several years, studying languages and history. In 1795, he returned to Edinburgh. An Essay on Harmony … adapted to the Violoncello was brought out at Edinburgh, 1801. About this time Gunn married Ann Young, a pianist and music teacher, who wrote the books Elements of Music, An Introduction to Music, and invented several musical games for the use in teaching.

In 1805 General Robertson of Lude, Perthshire, sent two harps, now known as the Queen Mary Harp and the Lamont Harp, to the Highland Society of Scotland in Edinburgh. The Society commissioned Gunn to inspect the instruments, and he read his report on the harp to the Society later that year. This paper was printed by their desire in 1807 as An Historical Enquiry respecting the performances of the Harp in the Highlands of Scotland, from the earliest times till it was discontinued about 1734, &c., 4to, Edinburgh. This was a valuable contribution to the history of music. Other works by Gunn were The Art of Playing the Flute and The School for the German Flute.
