= Grange North =

Grange North is the name of several places in Ireland:

- Grange North, a townland in Killaspugbrone civil parish, County Sligo
- Grange North, a townland in Relickmurry and Athassel, Tipperary - see List of townlands of County Tipperary
- Grange North, County Westmeath, a townland in Mullingar civil parish, County Westmeath
- Grange North, a townland in Killiskey, County Wicklow - see List of townlands of County Wicklow
- Grange North, an electoral division of Waterford City and County Council
