= History of the harp in Wales =

See: Telyn harps

The harp is the national instrument of Wales, with an unbroken line of harpers reaching back to at least the 11th century. Little is known of the origins of these early instruments, although small details such as poems are recorded, decrying the use of the new-fangled gut strings, as opposed to the traditional strings of plaited horse hair.

There are examples of triple harps made at Llanover and Llanrwst as well as those made by Bassett-Jones of Cardiff, and are on display at the St Fagans National History Museum near Cardiff.

A rebirth in the making of Celtic and triple harps came about in the mid-1960s by J.W. (John) Thomas of Gwaelod y Garth near Taffs Well. John Thomas died in 1992, but had passed on his skills to several apprentices. One of these apprentices, Allan Shiers founded Telynau Teifi Harps in 2004 in Llandysul, where Celtic and folk harps are still made.

== See also ==
- List of national instruments (music)
