= Celtic harp =

Celtic musical instrument

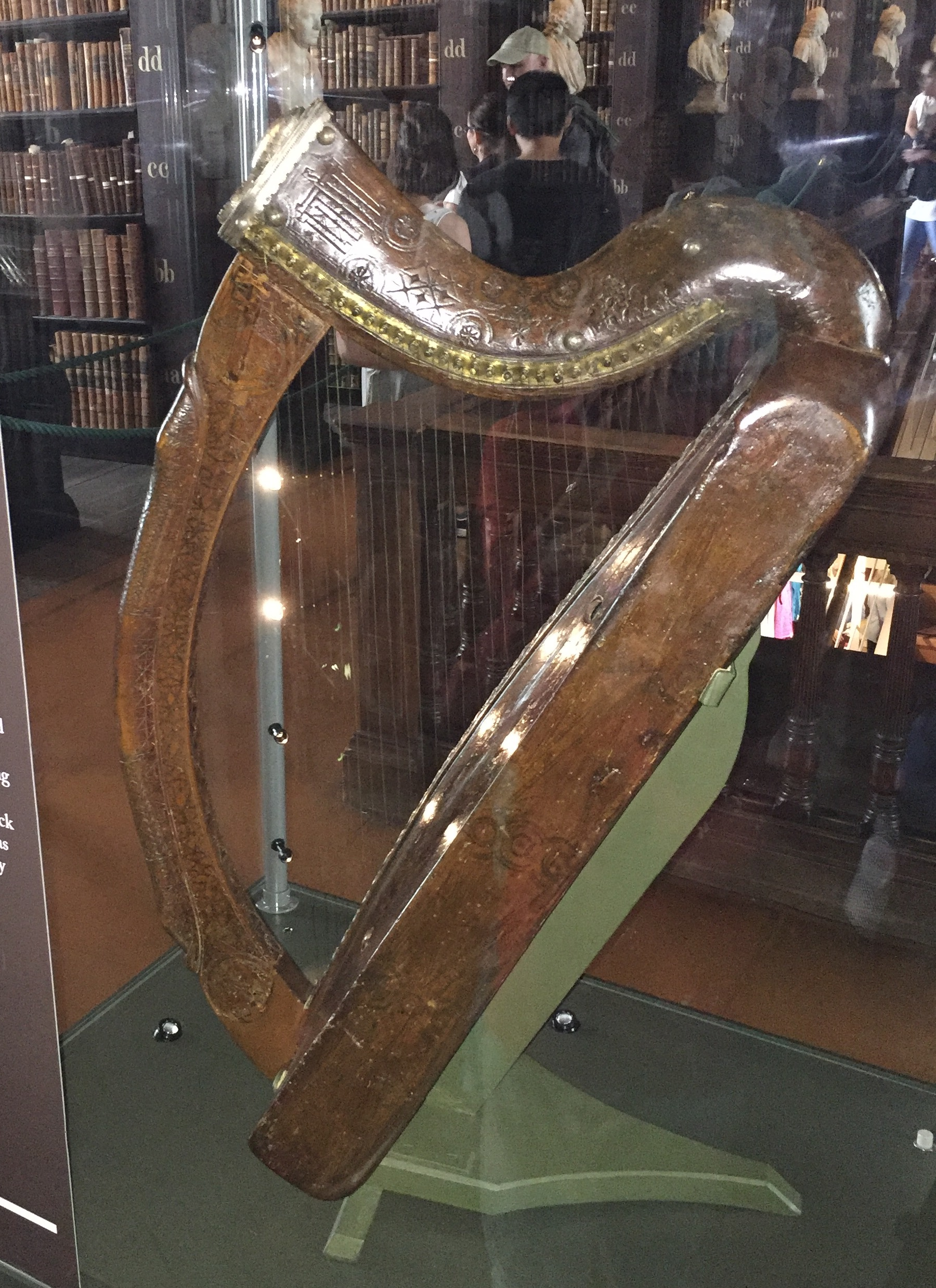
- 'Brian Boru's harp' (Cláirseach Brian Bóramha) on display in the Library of Trinity College Dublin

String instrument
- Other names: cláirseach, clàrsach, telyn, telenn
- Classification: Chordophones; Composite chordophones; Harps
- Hornbostel–Sachs classification: 322.221 (manually tuned frame harp)

Related instruments
- harp; angular harp; rotte

The Celtic harp is a triangular frame harp traditional to the Celtic nations of northwest Europe. It is known as cláirseach in Irish, clàrsach in Scottish Gaelic, telenn in Breton and telyn in Welsh. In Ireland and Scotland, it was a wire-strung instrument requiring great skill and long practice to play, and was traditionally associated with the Gaelic nobility of Ireland. It appears on Irish coins, Guinness products, and the coat of arms of the Republic of Ireland, Montserrat, Canada and the United Kingdom.

== Early history ==
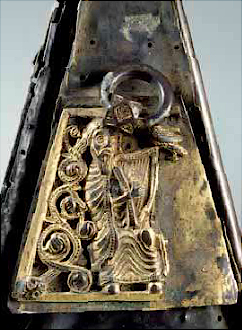
11th century depiction of an Irish harpist on the Breac Maodhóg

Irish harping
- UNESCO Intangible Cultural Heritage
- Country: Ireland
- Reference: 01461
- Region: Europe and North America

Inscription history
- Inscription: 2019 (14th session)
- List: Representative

The early history of the triangular frame harp in Europe is contested. The first instrument associated with the harping tradition in the Gaelic world was known as a cruit. This word may originally have described a different stringed instrument, being etymologically related to the Welsh crwth. It has been suggested that the word clàrsach / cláirseach (from clàr / clár, a board) was coined for the triangular frame harp which replaced the cruit, and that this coining was of Scottish origin.

A notched piece of wood which some have interpreted to be part of the bridge of an Iron Age lyre dating to around 300 BC was discovered on the Isle of Skye, which, if actually a bridge, would make it the oldest surviving fragment of a western European stringed instrument (although images of Greek lyres are much older). The earliest descriptions of a European triangular framed harp, i.e. harps with a fore pillar, are found on carved 8th century Pictish stones. Pictish harps were strung from horsehair. The instruments apparently spread south to the Anglo-Saxons, who commonly used gut strings and then west to the Gaels of the Highlands and to Ireland. Exactly thirteen depictions of any triangular chordophone instrument from pre-11th-century Europe exist and twelve of them come from Scotland.

The earliest Irish references to stringed instruments are from the 6th century, and players of such instruments were held in high regard by the nobility of the time. Early Irish law from 700 AD stipulates that bards and 'cruit' players should sit with the nobility at banquets and not with the common entertainers. Another stringed instrument from this era was the tiompán, most likely a kind of lyre. Despite providing the earliest evidence of stringed instruments in Ireland, no records described what these instruments looked like, or how the cruit and tiompán differed from one another.

Irish harps

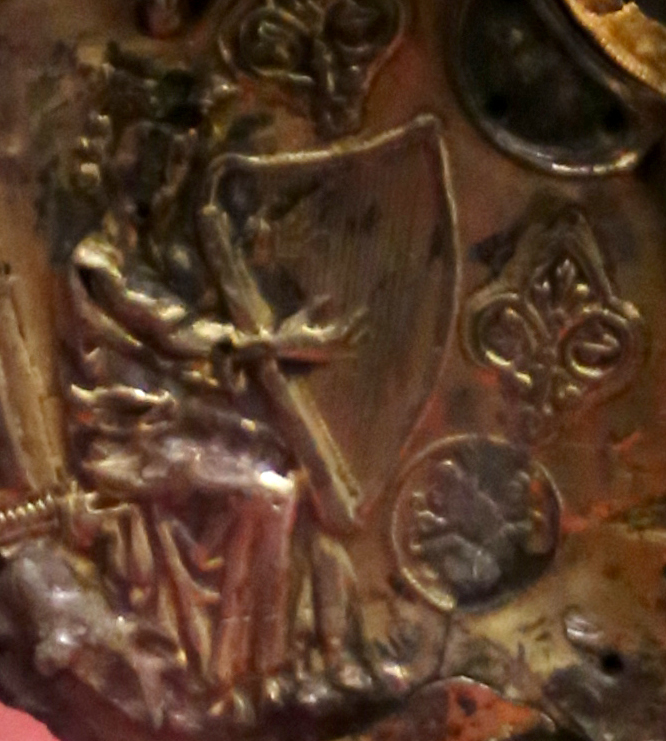
Harpist on the Shrine of St Patrick's Tooth, 14th century.

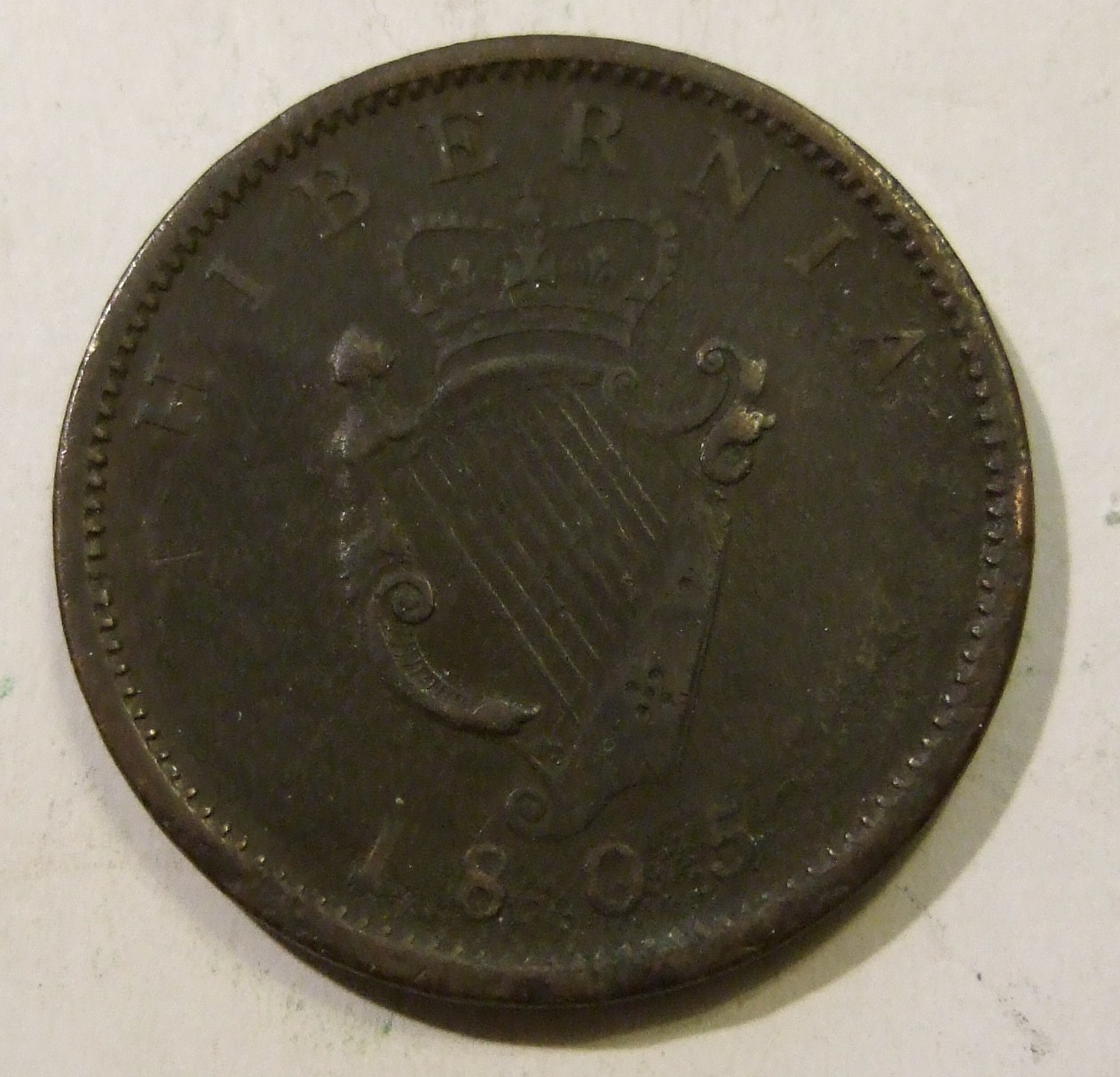
1805 Irish penny depicting an Irish harp, long used as a national symbol.

Only two quadrangular instruments occur within the Irish context on the west coast of Scotland and both carvings date two hundred years after the Pictish carvings. The first true representations of the Irish triangular harp do not appear till the late eleventh century in a reliquary and the twelfth century on stone and the earliest harps used in Ireland were quadrangular lyres as ecclesiastical instruments, One study suggests Pictish stone carvings may be copied from the Utrecht Psalter, the only other source outside Pictish Scotland to display a Triangular Chordophone instrument. The Utrecht Psalter was penned between 816 and 835 AD. However, Pictish Triangular Chordophone carvings found on the Nigg Stone date from 790 to 799 AD. and pre-date the document by up to forty years. Other Pictish sculptures also predate the Utrecht Psalter, namely the harper on the Dupplin Cross from c. 800 AD.

The Norman-Welsh cleric and scholar Gerald of Wales (c.1146 – c.1223), whose Topographica Hibernica and Expugnatio Hibernica is a description of Ireland from the Anglo-Norman point of view, praised Irish harp music (if little else), stating:

The only thing to which I find that this people apply a commendable industry is playing upon musical instruments… they are incomparably more skilful than any other nation I have ever seen

However, Gerald, who had a strong dislike of the Gaelic Irish, somewhat contradicts himself. While admitting that the style of music originated in Ireland, he immediately added that, in "the opinion of many", the Scots and the Welsh had now surpassed them in that skill. Gerald refers to the cythara and the tympanum, but their identification with the harp is uncertain, and it is not known that he ever visited Scotland.

Scotland and Wales, the former by reason of her derivation, the latter from intercourse and affinity, seek with emulous endeavours to imitate Ireland in music. Ireland uses and delights in but two instruments, the harp namely, and the tympanum. Scotland uses three, the harp, the tympanum, and the crowd.

— Gerald of Wales

Early images of the clàrsach are not common in Scottish iconography, but a gravestone at Kiells, in Argyllshire, dating from about 1500, shows one with a typically large soundbox, decorated with Gaelic designs. The Irish Saint Máedóc of Ferns reliquary shrine dates from c.1100, and clearly shows King David with a triangular framed harp including a "T-Section" in the pillar. The Irish word lamhchrann or Scottish Gaelic làmh-chrann came into use at an unknown date to indicate this pillar which would have supplied the bracing to withstand the tension of a wire-strung harp.

Three of the four pre-16th-century authentic harps that survive today are of Gaelic provenance: the Brian Boru Harp in Trinity College, Dublin, and the Queen Mary and Lamont Harps, both in the National Museum of Scotland, Edinburgh. The last two are examples of the small low-headed harp, and were long believed to have been made from hornbeam, a wood not native to Scotland or Ireland. This theory has been refuted by Karen Loomis in her 2015 PhD thesis. All three are dated approximately to the 15th century and may have been made in Argyll in western Scotland.

One of the largest and most complete collections of 17th–18th century harp music is the work of Turlough O'Carolan, a blind, itinerant Irish harper and composer. At least 220 of his compositions survive to this day.

=== Telyn harps ===
See: History of the harp in Wales

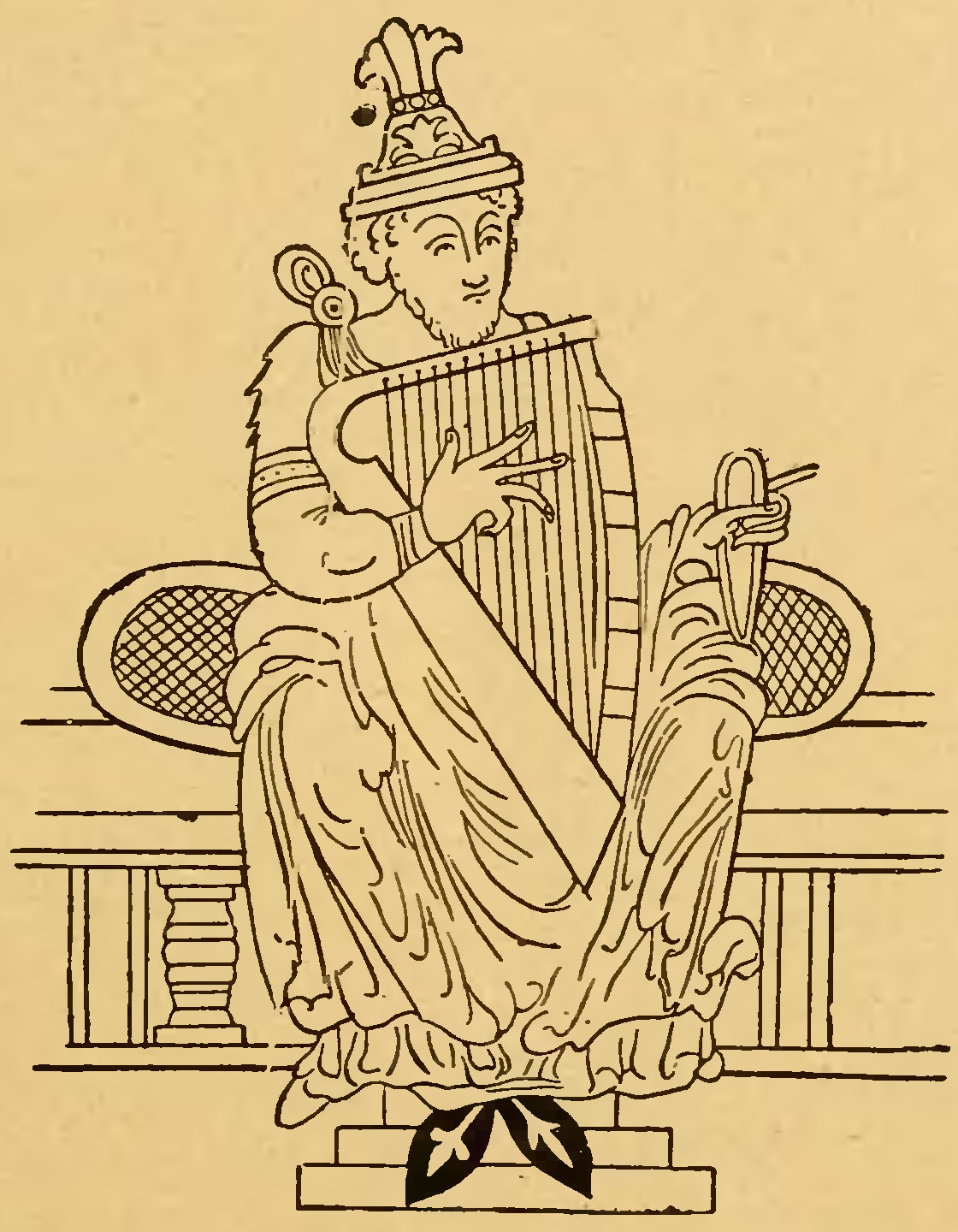
19th century line drawing. The author of the book it was illustrated in believed that it illustrates a Welsh harper from the 9th century. May originate the 10th century in an Anglo-Saxon work.

In Wales, harp was telyn in Welsh; words were added to indicate variations: telyn benglin (lap harp), telyn farddol (bardic harp), telyn rawn (harp using horsehair strings), telyn ledr (harp strung with gut strings). The tradition in harps are found "frequently" in literature, starting about the 12th century A.D. Welsh harps, played by professional musicians called clerwyr, were distinguished from those in larger Europe by the way they were strung.

Like the Irish, the Welsh did have metal-strung harps. However, they also used horsehair strings, in preference to the gut strings in widespread use on the continent. Horsehair strings remained in common use through the 17th century, and gut strings gradually grew into use in Wales as well. The telyn had an early single-strung form that was "distinct from its Irish counterpart," with a "straighter pillar" than the Irish harps. Welsh harps had a frame made from wood, with an animal-hide soundboard, wood or bone pegs, and about 30 horsehair strings. Strings might have L-shaped wooden pegs (gwarchïod) which touched the strings at the bottom and caused them to buzz. Telyns were played on the musician's left shoulder. Over time, the Welsh had harps in a number of shapes and sizes, which were superseded in about 1700 by the Italian chromatic triple harp, and later the pedal harp. However, harpists today claim that they have an "unbroken history" from the harps' early use to the present day. After being displaced by the pedal harp, the triple harp has been the focus of a revival in Wales.

== Characteristics and function ==
Two experts in this field, John Bannerman and Michael Newton, agree that, by the 1500s, the most common Celtic harp strings were made of brass. Historical sources do not seem to mention the strings' gauge or materials, other than references to a very low-quality and simply-made brass, often contemporarily called "red brass." Modern-day experiments on stringing a Celtic harp include testing of more exotic and custom materials, including copper alloys, silver, and gold. Other experiments include more easily obtainable materials, including softer iron, as well as yellow and red brass. The strings attach to a soundbox, typically carved from a single log, commonly of willow, although other woods, including alder and poplar, have been identified in extant harps. The Celtic harp also had a reinforced curved pillar and a substantial neck, flanked with thick brass cheek bands. The strings are plucked with long fingernails. This type of harp is also unique amongst single-row triangular harps in that the first two strings tuned in the middle of the gamut were set to the same pitch.

=== Components ===
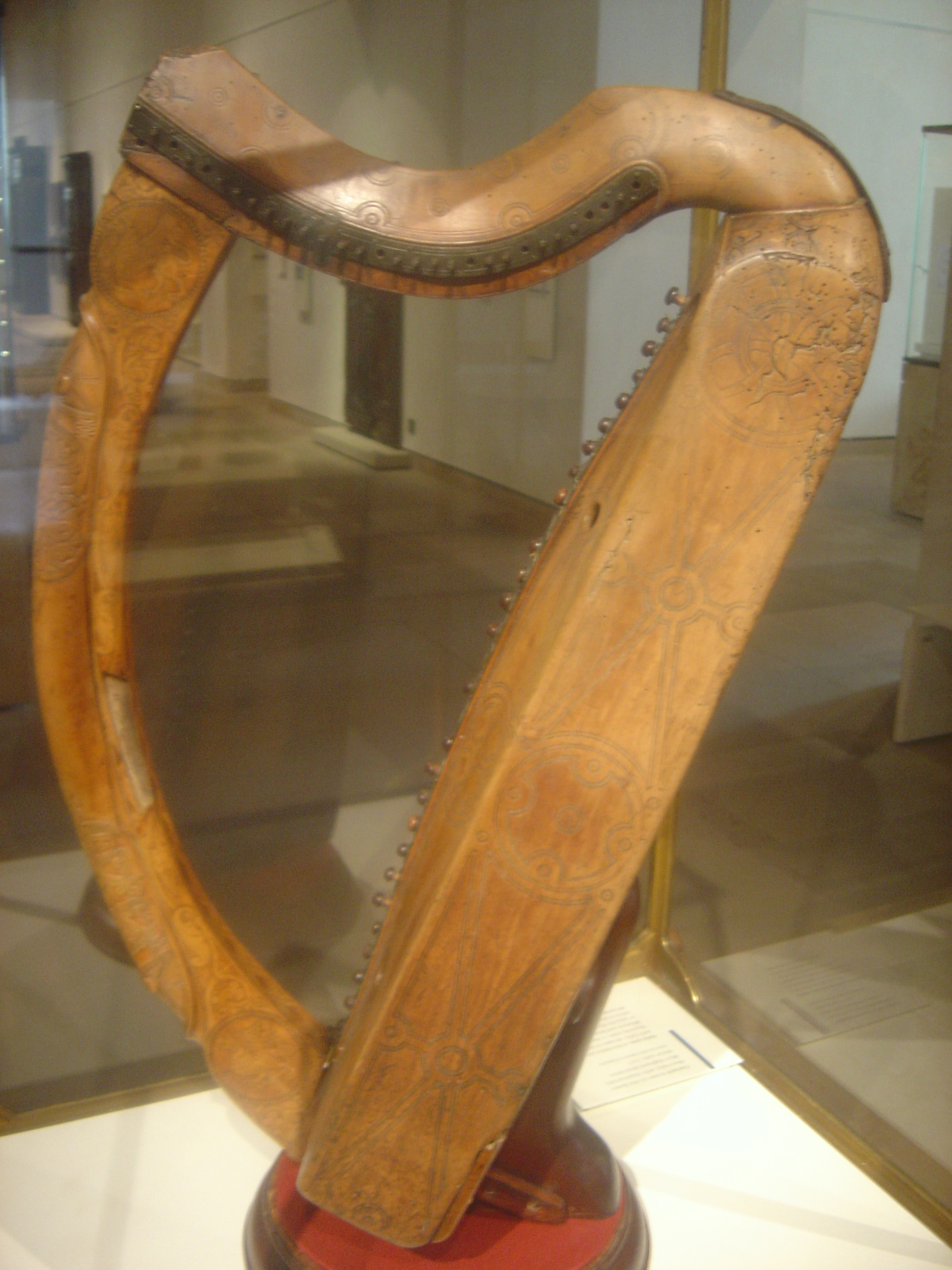
The medieval 'Queen Mary harp' (Clàrsach na Banrìgh Màiri) preserved in the National Museum of Scotland, Edinburgh

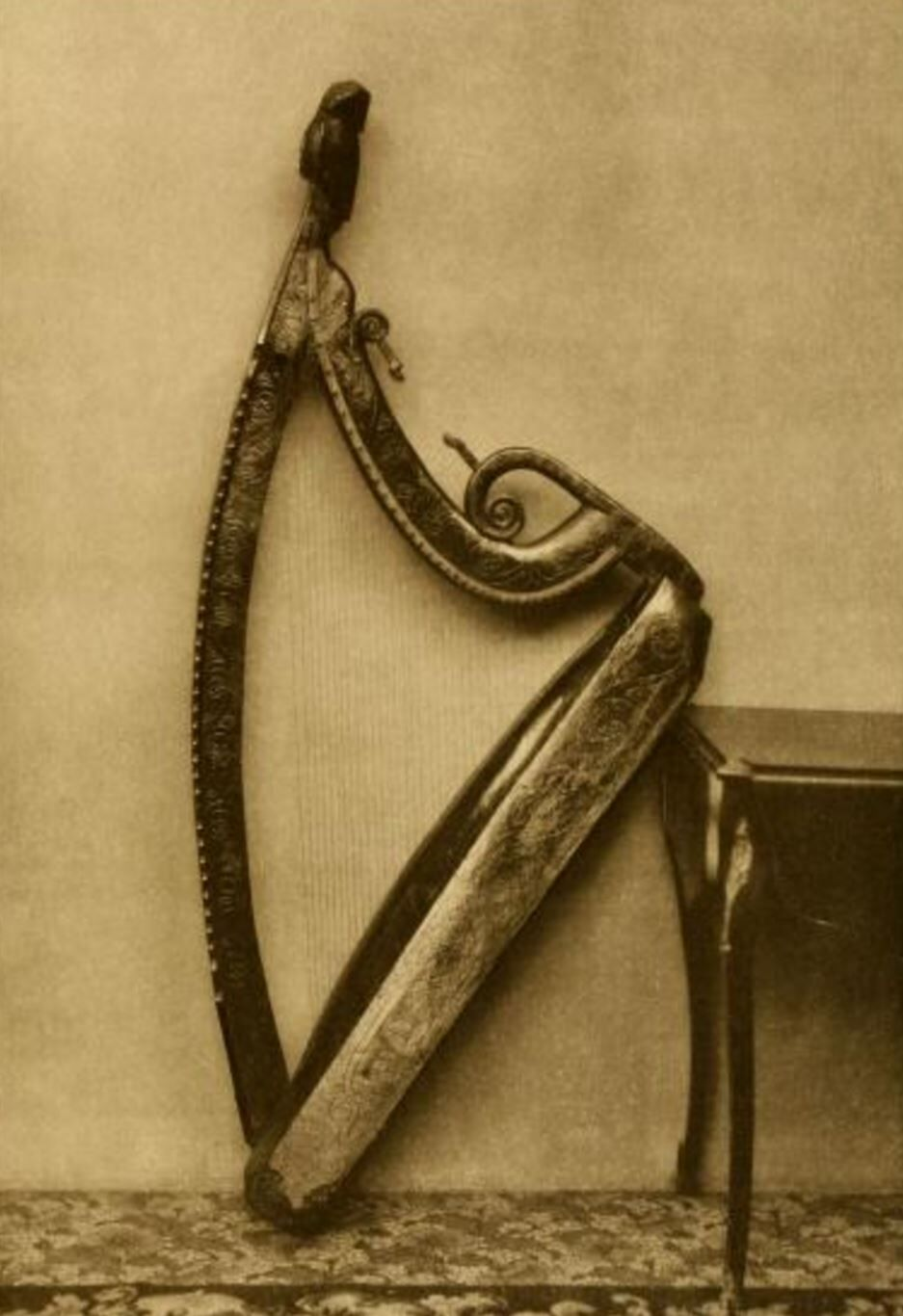
The Bunworth Harp (1734), a later example of a more characteristically "Irish Harp" from County Cork

The names of the components of the cláirseach were as follows:

Celtic harp components
Irish	Scottish Gaelic	English
amhach	amhach	neck
cnaga	cnagan	pins
corr	còrr	pin-board
com	com	chest or soundbox
lámhchrann	làmh-chrann	tree or forepillar
téada	teudan	strings
crúite na dtéad	cruidhean nan teud	string shoes
fhorshnaidhm	urshnaim	toggle

The corr had a brass strap nailed to each side, pierced by tapered brass tuning pins. The treble end had a tenon which fitted into the top of the com (soundbox). On a low-headed harp, the corr was morticed at the bass end to receive a tenon on the lámhchrann; on a high-headed harp, this tenon fitted into a mortice on the back of the lámhchrann.

The com (soundbox) was usually carved from a single piece of willow, hollowed out from behind. A panel of harder timber was carefully inserted to close the back.

Crúite na dtéad (string shoes) were usually made of brass and prevented the metal strings from cutting into the wood of the soundbox.

The fhorshnaidhm may refer to the wooden toggle to which a string was fastened once it had emerged from its hole in the soundboard.

=== Playing technique ===
The playing of the wire-strung harp has been described as extremely difficult. Because of the long-lasting resonance, the performer had to dampen the strings which had just been played while new strings were being plucked, and this while playing rapidly. Contrary to conventional modern practice, the left hand played the treble and the right the bass. It was said that a player should begin to learn the harp no later than the age of seven. The best modern players have shown, however, that reasonable competence may be achieved even at a later age.

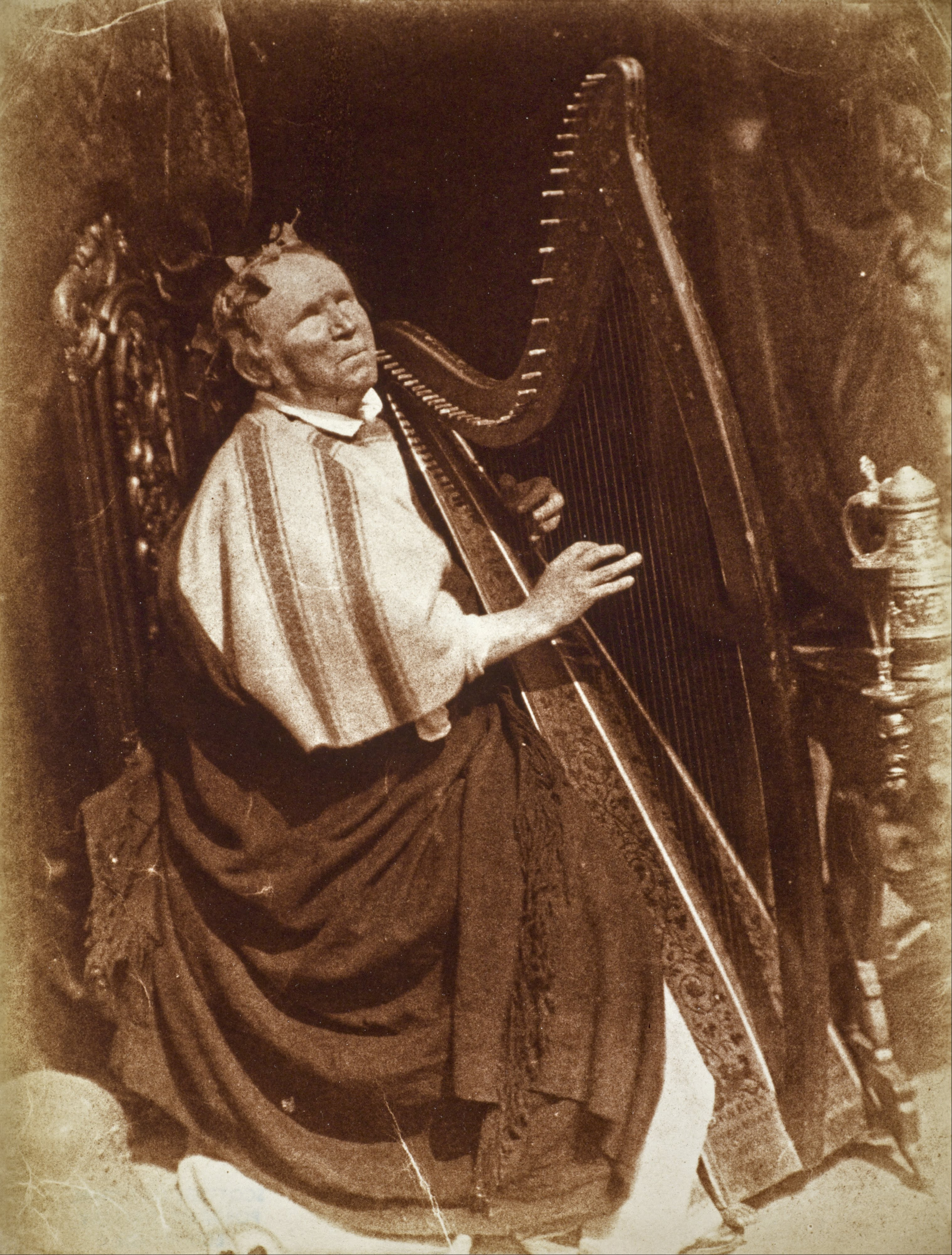
1845 calotype photograph of the Irish harper Pádraig Dall Ó Beirn (1794-1863)

=== Social function and decline ===
During the medieval period, the wire-strung harp was in demand throughout the Gaelic territories, which stretched from the northern Highlands and Western Isles of Scotland to the south of Ireland. The Gaelic worlds of Scotland and Ireland, however, while retaining close links, were already showing signs of divergence in the sixteenth century in language, music and social structure.

The harp was the aristocratic instrument of Gaelic Ireland, and harpers enjoyed a high social status which was codified in Brehon Law. The patronage of harpers was adopted by Norman and British settlers in Ireland until the late 18th century, although their standing in society was greatly diminished with the introduction of the English class system. In his biography of Turlough O'Carolan, historian Donal O'Sullivan writes:

We may note as a remarkable fact that the descendants of Protestant settlers, who had been at most for three generations in the country, seem to have been just as devoted to the Irish music of the harp as were the old Gaelic families.

The function of the clàrsach in a Hebridean lordship, both as entertainment and as literary metaphor, is illustrated in the songs of Màiri Nic Leòid (Mary MacLeod) (c. 1615–c. 1705), a prominent Gaelic poet of her time. The chief is praised as one who is skilled in judging harp-playing, the theme of a story and the pith of sense:

Tuigsear nan teud,
Purpais gach sgèil,
Susbaint gach cèill nàduir.

The music of harp and pipe is shown to be intrinsic to the splendour of the MacLeod court, along with wine in shining cups:

Gu àros nach crìon
Am bi gàirich nam pìob
Is nan clàrsach a rìs
Le deàrrsadh nam pìos
A' cur sàraidh air fìon
Is 'ga leigeadh an gnìomh òircheard.

Here, the great Highland bagpipe shares the high status of the clàrsach. It would help supplant the harp, and may already have developed its own classical tradition in the form of the elaborate "great music" (ceòl mòr). An elegy to Sir Donald MacDonald of Clanranald, attributed to his widow in 1618, contains a very early reference to the bagpipe in a lairdly setting:

Is iomadh sgal pìobadh
Mar ri farrum nan dìsnean air clàr
Rinn mi èisdeachd a’d' bhaile...

There is evidence that the musical tradition of the clàrsach may have influenced the use and repertoire of the bagpipe. The oral mnemonic system called canntaireachd, used for encoding and teaching ceòl mòr, is first mentioned in the 1226 obituary of a clàrsair (harp player). Terms relating to theme and variation on the clàrsach and the bagpipe correlate to each other. Founders of bagpipe dynasties are also noted as clársach players.

The names of a number of the last harpers are recorded. The blind Duncan McIndeor, who died in 1694, was harper to Campbell of Auchinbreck, but also frequented Edinburgh. A receipt for "two bolls of meall", dated 1683, is extant for another harper, also blind, named Patrick McErnace, who apparently played for Lord Neill Campbell. The harper Manus McShire is mentioned in an account book covering the period 1688–1704. A harper called Neill Baine is mentioned in a letter dated 1702 from a servitor of Allan MacDonald of Clanranald. Angus McDonald, harper, received payment on the instructions of Menzies of Culdares on 19 June 1713, and the Marquis of Huntly's accounts record a payment to two harpers in 1714. Other harpers include Rory Dall Morison (who died c. 1714), Lachlan Dall (who died c. 1721–1727), and Murdoch MacDonald (who died c. 1740).

By the middle of the eighteenth century, the "violer" (fiddle player) had replaced the harper, a consequence, perhaps, of the growing influence in the Gaelic world of Lowland Scots culture.

== Revival ==
=== Ireland and Scotland ===
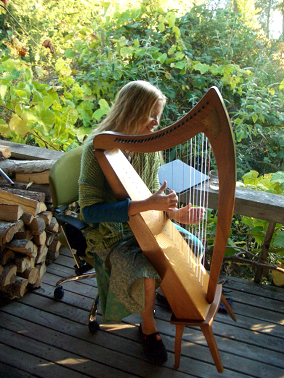
A modern 'Celtic harp' in Canada

In the early 19th century, even as the old Gaelic harp tradition was dying out, the increasing dominance of England resulted in a desire to forge independent national identities in the Celtic countries. Since pedal harps were made in England, Celtic nationalists started to revive traditional harps. The revival in Ireland was started by a self-taught Dublin native John Egan. He initially opened a pedal harp making business, but joined the national revival movement and created twelve new models, including the "Improved Irish Harp" (5 ft tall, conical back and a flat soundboard) and the "Portable Irish Harp" (3 ft tall, bowed pillar), regarded as his most important invention. The Improved Irish Harp had wire strings, but the shape of its body was derived from the pedal harp; the Portable Irish Harp was marketed as "the exact form as the beautiful antique Irish Harp in the Museum of Trinity College", but had only surface-level similarlty to it: Egan's harp was strung with gut, not wire; its body built in sections and not from a hollowed piece of wood -- it made the harp lighter; Improved Harp also included a hand-operated disc mechanism with ring stops that shifted the string's pitch the same way a pedal on a pedal harp does. The new Irish harps were heavily decorated with national symbols such as shamrocks and wolfhounds painted in green or gold.

In the 1890s, a similar new harp became popular in Scotland as part of a Gaelic cultural revival.

The Celtic Revival that started at the end of the 19th century revitalised the making of the new Irish harps. Harpists and harp competitions were sponsored by Feis Ceoil and Oireachtas na Gaeilge, inspired by the Welsh eisteddfod. However, by the 1890s, there were no Irish makers of the Irish harp, so historian and harp collector Reverend James O'Laverty led a press campaign for the establishment of a local harp-making business and persuaded furniture maker James McFall to become a luthier. O'Laverty mentored McFall and not only provided his collection for study, but later arranged McFall's access to the instruments held in Dublin and Belfast museums. McFall made a new model of the Irish harp called "Tara"; it had a bowed pillar and a tall head, but also a curved back, which McFall took from Egan's instruments. It was strung with gut and had ring stops that made it fully chromatic, like a pedal harp, but was heavily decorated with designs created by the Irish Decorative Art Association based on manuscripts like the Book of Kells and burnt-wood engravings on the pillar and soundboard. Other models created by McFall were the "Bardic", a smaller harp with gut strings, and the "Ministrel", a hand-held wire-strung harp. His harps were sent to Loreto Abbey, Rathfarnham, Sion Hill, Blackrock and convent schools in Ireland, Australia, New Zealand and South Africa. Despite the desire of many musicians to focus on Irish music, the repertoire for the new Irish harp included a lot of Western classical pieces.

There is also a renewed interest in the wire-strung harp, or clàrsach, with replicas being made and research being conducted into ancient playing techniques and terminology. A notable event in the revival of the Celtic harp is the Edinburgh International Harp Festival, which has been held annually since 1982 and includes both performances and instructional workshops.

=== Wales ===
In Wales, the national harp revival was focused on the triple harp. Harps were seen as an important national symbol and strongly connected to the eisteddfod festivals, especially the tradition of penillion singing to the harp accompaniment (itself invented in the 19th century). Lady Llanover, a patron of the Welsh arts, invited musicians to play triple harps during events. The Cymreigyddion Society appointed Bassett Jones (1809-1869) to be its official harp maker, and he studied the surviving triple harps made by John Richards (1171-1789) to restart the production of this instrument, which had stopped in the previous century. Jones successfully made a lightweight triple harp that was given away at competitions sponsored by Lady Llanover. These harps also had been decorated with national symbols, although Jones also sought to please the Crown too: for instance, the harp he made for the Prince of Wales in the 1840s had druid-inspired oak leaves and a Welsh leek, but also triple plumes and a crown. Some of his harps also have pedal harp-like conical backs instead of stave-back ones.

Harpist John Thomas promoted the idea that the triple harp is a Welsh invention, despite clear evidence of Italian origin (although the Italian triple harp ceased to be played in the 17th century). He switched to the pedal harp in his own musical practice, but maintained a connection to Wales.

By the end of the 19th century, the triple harp was again in decline; the only community using it was the rural Kale, the Romani people of Wales. Romani harpist Nansi Richards played a crucial role in the revival of the triple harp by passing on traditional tunes and techniques, such as the echo effect achieved by the consecutive plucking of the outer strings of the harp (tuned in unison), as heard in "The Bells of Aberdovey".

=== Brittany ===
In Brittany in the 1950s, Georges Cochevelou, a carpenter and pianist, successfully attempted to reconstruct the Celtic Harp. His son, Alan Stivell (né Cochevelou), continues to play the instrument as of 2026.

== Bibliography ==
- Armstrong, Robert Bruce (1904). The Irish and The Highland Harps. Edinburgh: David Douglas.
- Bannerman, John (1991). "The Clàrsach and the Clàrsair". Scottish Studies, vol. 30 no. 3.
- Budgey, Andrea (2002). "Musical relations between Scotland and Ireland" [in] McDonald, R. Andrew, [ed.] Literature and Music in Scotland: 700–1560. University of Toronto Press, ISBN 0802036015; ISBN 978-0802036018.
- Caldwell, D.H., [ed.] (1982). Angels, Nobles and Unicorns: Art and Patronage in Medieval Scotland. Edinburgh: NMS.
- Cathcart, Cynthia (Summer 2009). "Silver report: Precious metal strings on the wire-strung harp". Folk Harp Journal, no. 143, pp. 34–43. available via wirestrungharp.com Archived 3 March 2011 at the Wayback Machine .
- Chadwick, Simon (November 2008). "The Early Irish Harp". Early Music, vol. 36, no. 4, pp. 521–532.
- Collinson, Francis (1983)[1966]. The Bagpipe, Fiddle and Harp. Routledge & Kegan Paul, 1966; reprinted by Lang Syne Publishers Ltd., ISBN 0946264481, ISBN 978-0946264483.
- Dimock, James F., [ed.] (1867). Giraldi Cambrensis opera: Giraldi Cambrensis Topographica Hibernica et Expugnatio Hibernica. London, UK: Longmans, Green, Reader, and Dyer.
- Farmer, Henry George (1947). A History of Music in Scotland, p. 280. London, UK.
- Heymann, Ann & Heymann, Charlie (Fall 1991). "Cláirseach: The Lore of the Irish Harp". Éire-Ireland, vol. 26, no. 3.
- Heymann, Ann & Heymann, Charlie (Summer 2003). "Strings of Gold". The Historical Harp Society Journal, vol. 13, no. 3, pp. 9–15. available via annheymann.com Archived 19 August 2007 at the Wayback Machine .
- Hurrell, Nancy (2024). "Nineteenth-Century Welsh and Irish Harps: Authentic Revival or Invented Traditions?". The American Harp Journal. 29 (3): 26–52. ISSN 0002-869X.
- Lanier, Sara C. (1999). "'It is new-strung and shan't be heard': Nationalism and Memory in the Irish Harp Tradition". British Journal of Ethnomusicology, vol. 8.
- Lawlor, Helen (2012). Irish Harping, 1900–2010. Dublin: Four Courts Press, ISBN 978-1-84682-367-1.
- Le Govic, Tristan (2015). The Breton Harp Anthology (Antologiezh Telenn Breizh) Vol. II
- Newton, Michael & Cheape, Hugh (n.d.) "The Keening of Women and the Roar of the Pipe: From Clársach to Bagpipe, ca. 1600–1782". available via academia.edu Archived 25 April 2022 at the Wayback Machine .
- Ó Brógáin, Séamas (1998). The Irish Harp Emblem. Dublin, IE: Wolfhound Press, ISBN 0-86327-635-0.
- O'Donnell, Mary Louise (2014). Ireland's Harp: The Shaping of Irish Identity c.1770–1880. Dublin, IE: University College Dublin Press, ISBN 978-1-90635-986-7.
- Rensch, Roslyn (1989). Harps and Harpists, pp. 125–127. Indiana University Press.
- Rimmer, Joan (1964). "The Morphology of the Irish Harp". The Galpin Society Journal, no. 17.
- Rimmer, Joan (1984)[1969] The Irish Harp: Cláirseach na hÉireann, 3rd ed. The Mercier Press, ISBN 0-85342-151-X [1st ed. 1969; 2nd ed. 1977].
- Sanger, Keith & Kinnaird, Alison (1992). Tree of Strings – Crann nan Teud. Kinmor Music, ISBN 0-95112-044-1.
- Watson, J. Carmichael, [ed.] (1934). Gaelic Songs of Mary MacLeod. Blackie & Son. available via archive.org .
- Yeats, Gráinne (1980). Féile na gCruitirí, Béal Feirste [The Belfast Harpers' Festival] 1972. Gael Linn, ISBN 0-86233-025-4.
