= John Egan (harp maker) =

Irish musical instrument maker (fl. 1804–1838)

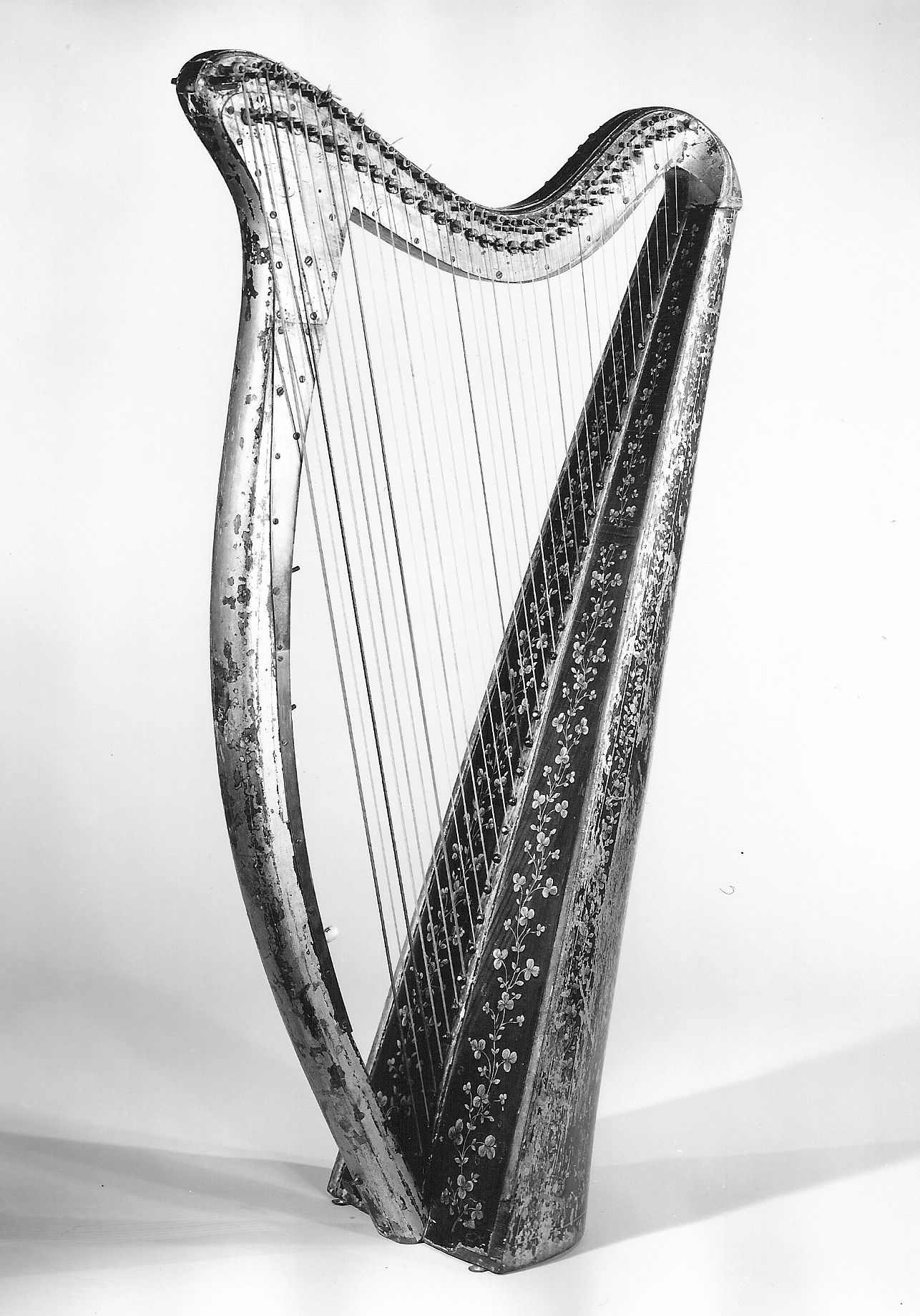
Portable harp made by John Egan, photographed in 1819

John Egan was an Irish musical instrument maker active during the years 1804 to 1838, who is considered by many as the father of the modern Irish harp. According to Simon Chadwick, honorary secretary of the Historical Harp Society of Ireland, "The ancient Irish harp tradition, which goes back to medieval times, was dying out around 1800. Egan invented a completely new romantic type of Irish harp, which was very successful, and which formed the basis of all subsequent revivals."

Egan overcame the restrictions of the traditional Irish harp by adding the dital tuning mechanism and pliable catgut strings of the European pedal harps, calling his creation "portables". Of the c.2000 harps Egan made, only 37 are known to exist. Although they are not considered as priceless as a Stradivarius violin, for instance, they are considered classic instruments, and have been priced as high as US$24,000.
