= Lamont Harp =

Medieval musical instrument from Scotland

Coordinates: 55.947°N 3.189°W

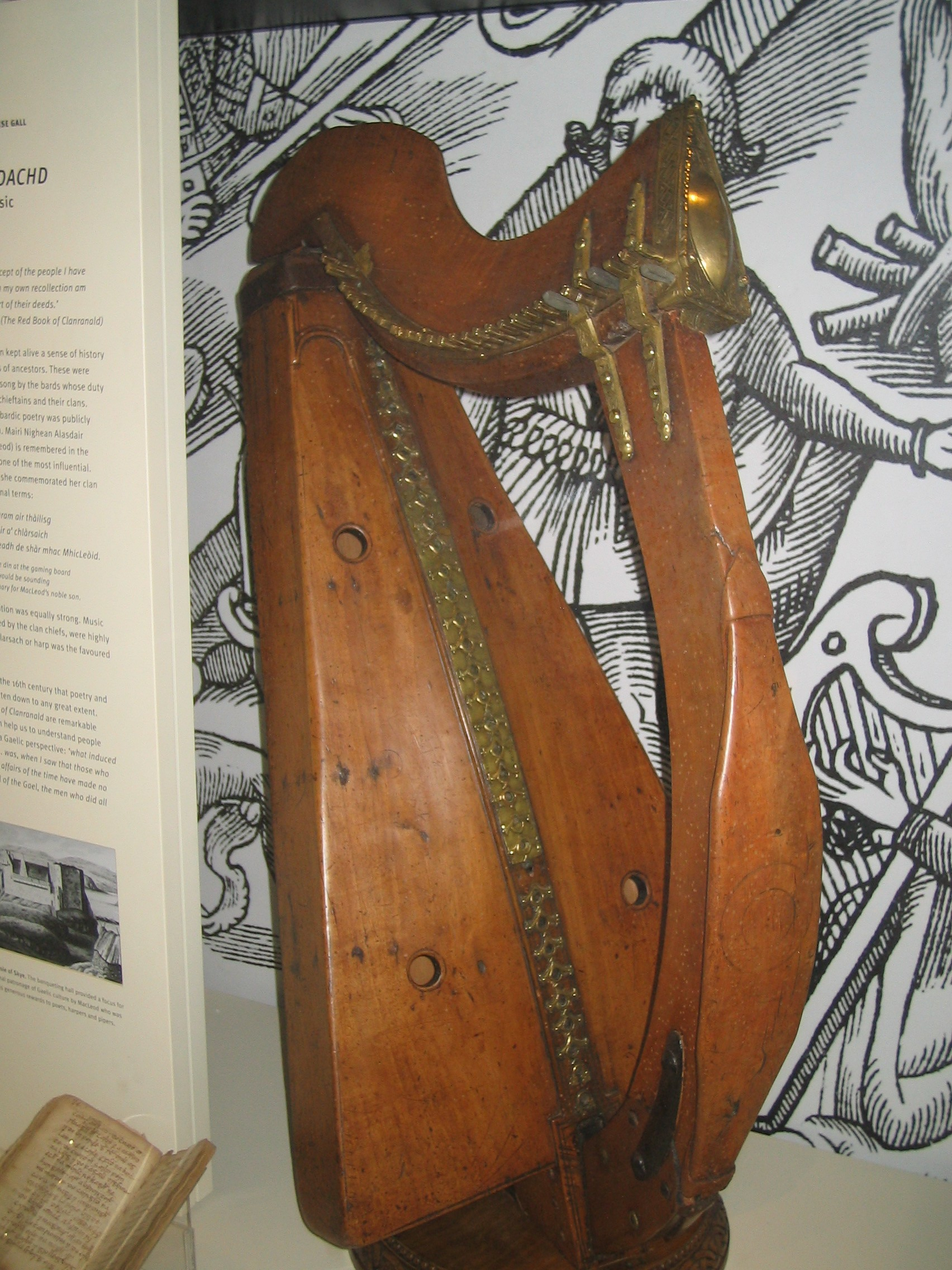
The Lamont Harp Clàrsach Lumanach, a medieval Gaelic harp preserved in the National Museum of Scotland, Edinburgh.

The Lamont Harp, or Clàrsach Lumanach (also known as the Caledonian Harp or Lude Harp) is a Scottish Clarsach currently displayed in the National Museum of Scotland. It is believed to date back to the 15th century, and to have originated in Argyll. Along with the Queen Mary Harp and the Trinity College harp, it is one of the only three surviving medieval Gaelic harps.

== History ==
The Lamont harp was presented to the Robertson family of Lude 1460-1464 as part of a marriage dowry to Charles Robertson of Lude (or of Clune). The Lamont Harp was handed down in the Robertson family and remained at Lude in Perthshire until 1805, when both the Lamont Harp and the Queen Mary Harp were sent to Edinburgh. In 1880 both clarsachs were deposited by a John Stewart of Dalguise in the National Museum of Edinburgh now the Museum of Scotland, where they remain.

== Appearance ==
The Lamont Harp stands 95 cm tall and 42.5 cm wide and is considerably larger than the 2 other medieval harps (Queen Mary and Trinity harps), but smaller than other surviving Gaelic Harps. The Lamont harp has very little decorative carving when compared to the other surviving examples, and was constructed with fine metal fittings, notably fox styled metal reinforcements between the pillar (Lamhchrann) and neck of the instrument, the metal head is beaten to imitate a gem setting and the square drives of the tuning pins are fitted to resemble cloves or rosebuds. The Lamont harp bears the inscription “Al Stew(art) of Clunie his Harp 165(0)” although this is too late a date for the original construction of the harp this may relate to the repair. The wood has been identified as hornbeam or English walnut. The pillar has distorted over time; the T-section reinforcement is shorter than on other early Gaelic harps, and the distortion does seem to have happened at the ends, where the pillar is wide but thin.

In 1805 both the Lamont Harp and Queen Mary Harp were exhibited to the Highland Society of Scotland. The Society commissioned a history from the author John Gunn, published in 1807, titled "An Historical Enquiry Respecting the Performance of the Harp in the Highlands of Scotland; from the earliest times, until it was discontinued, about the Year 1734 to which is prefixed an account of a Very Ancient Caledonian Harp, and of the Harp of Queen Mary illustrated by three elegant engravings."

== Replicas ==
Many modern harp makers have produced efforts at replicas and reproductions of the harp. One of the difficulties is establishing the original form and string lengths, due to the present distorted state of the instrument, and the natural desire to avoid the catastrophic fate of the original. It may be that during its lifetime the Lamont harp was re-strung with heavier, possibly brass wires, in order to change its volume or tone. It is speculated that the original stringing used gold wire in the bass, to achieve satisfactory tone, though this is still somewhat controversial. Ann Heymann and others have successfully strung medieval harps with gold bass strings.
