= Frank Llewellyn Harrison =

Irish musicologist, organist, and composer

Frank Ll. Harrison
- Frank Llewellyn Harrison
- Born: 29 September 1905; Dublin, Ireland
- Died: 29 December 1987 (age 82); Canterbury, England
- Education: Royal Irish Academy of Music; Jesus College, Oxford; Trinity College Dublin
- Occupation: Musicologist
- Employer(s): Queen's University; Colgate University; Washington University in St. Louis; University of Amsterdam

Francis Llewellyn Harrison, FBA (29 September 1905 – 29 December 1987), better known as "Frank Harrison" or "Frank Ll. Harrison", was an Irish musicologist, organist, and composer. He was one of the leading musicologists of his time and a pioneering ethnomusicologist. Initially trained as an organist and composer, he turned to musicology in the early 1950s, first specialising in English and Irish music of the Middle Ages and increasingly turning to ethnomusicological subjects in the course of his career. His Music in Medieval Britain (1958) is still a standard work on the subject, and Time, Place and Music (1973) is a key textbook on ethnomusicology.

== Education and early musical career ==
Born in Dublin, Ireland, Harrison was the second son of Alfred Francis Harrison and Florence May, née Nash. The Welsh origin of his second given name, "Llewellyn", derives from his maternal grandmother, a Williams from Anglesey. He became a chorister at St Patrick's Cathedral in 1912 and was educated at the cathedral grammar school (until 1920) and at Mountjoy School (1920–1922). A competent organist, he was deputy organist at St Patrick's from 1925 to 1928. In 1920, he also began musical studies at the Royal Irish Academy of Music, where he studied with John F. Larchet (composition), George Hewson (organ) and Michele Esposito (piano). In 1926, he graduated Bachelor of Music at Trinity College Dublin and was awarded a doctorate (MusD) in 1929 for a musical setting of Psalm 19. He then worked in Kilkenny for one year, serving as organist at St Canice's Cathedral and music teacher at Kilkenny College.

In 1930, Harrison emigrated to Canada to become organist at Westminster Presbyterian Church in New Glasgow, Nova Scotia. In 1933, he studied briefly with Marcel Dupré in France, but returned to Canada in 1934 to become organist at Knox Presbyterian Church in Ottawa. In 1935, he took a position as organist and choirmaster at St. George's Cathedral in Kingston, Ontario, as well as taking up the newly created post of "resident musician" at Queen's University. His duties included "giving lectures, running a choir and an orchestra, and conducting concerts himself. His course in the history and appreciation of music was the first music course to be given for full credit at Queen's." He resigned from St. George's in 1941 to become assistant professor of music at Queen's in 1942. During his years in Canada he still pursued the idea of remaining a performing musician and composer, winning three national composition competitions: for Winter's Poem (1931), Baroque Suite (1943) and Night Hymns on Lake Nipigon (1945).

On a year's leave of absence from Queen's Harrison studied composition with Paul Hindemith at Yale University, also taking courses in musicology with Leo Schrade. In 1946, he took up a position at Colgate University in Hamilton, New York, and then moved on to Washington University in St. Louis, as head of the new Department of Music (1947–1950).

== Musicological career ==
In 1951, Harrison took the degrees of Master of Arts (M.A.) and Doctor of Music (DMus) at Jesus College, Oxford, and became lecturer (1952), senior lecturer (1956), and reader in the history of music (1962–70) there. In 1965, he was elected Fellow the British Academy and Senior Research Fellow at Oxford. From 1970 to 1980, Harrison was Professor of Ethnomusicology at the University of Amsterdam, the Netherlands, retiring to part-time teaching in 1976.

He also held Visiting Professorships in musicology at Yale University (1958–9), Princeton University (spring 1961 and 1968–9), and Dartmouth College (winter 1968 and spring 1972). He also briefly returned to Queen's University at Kingston as Queen's Quest Visiting Professor in the fall of 1980 and was Visiting Andrew W. Mellon Professor of Music at the University of Pittsburgh for the calendar year 1981.

Harrison's honorary titles also included Doctor of Laws at Queen's University, Kingston (1974), Corresponding Member of the American Musicological Society (1981), and Vice President and Chairman of the Plainsong and Medieval Music Society (1985). At Queen's also, the new Harrison-LeCaine Hall (1974) was partly named in his honour.

Harrison was married twice: with his first wife Nora he had two daughters. In 1965, he married the noted organologist Joan Rimmer, with whom he collaborated in ethnomusicological fieldwork and its scholarly documentation in a number of common publications.

== Legacy ==
In 1989, Harry White appreciated Harrison as "an Irish musicologist of international standing and of seminal influence, whose scholarly achievement, astonishingly, encompassed virtually the complete scope of the discipline which he espoused." David F. L. Chadd wrote of him "He was above all things an explorer, tirelessly curious and boyishly delighted in the pursuit of knowledge, experience and ideas, and totally heedless of artificially imposed constraints and boundaries."

Since 2004, the Society for Musicology in Ireland (SMI) awards a bi-annual Harrison Medal in his honour to distinguished international musicologists.

== Compositions ==
(all unpublished)

- Psalm 19 (1929) for choir and orchestra
- Winter's Poem (1931) for organ
- Concertino (1932) for piano and orchestra
- Ode of Remembrance (1940) for choir
- Baroque Suite (1943) for orchestra
- Night Hymns on Lake Nipigon (c1944) for solo voice, chorus and orchestra
- Sonata for Clarinet and Piano (1946)
- Three Pieces for Clarinet and Piano (before 1948)
- Two Preludes (before 1948) for piano
- Homage to Spring (c.1950) for soprano and piano
- other works for organ and piano

== Music editions ==
- The Eton Choirbook (Musica Britannica, volumes 10–12) (London, 1956–61; second edition 1969–73).
- John Sheppard: Sechs Responsorien zu 4 und 6 Stimmen (Das Chorwerk, vol. 84) (Wolfenbüttel, 1960).
- William Mundy: Latin Antiphons and Psalms (Early English Church Music, vol. 2) (London, 1963).
- Motets of French Provenance (Polyphonic Music of the Fourteenth Century, vol. 5) (Monaco, 1968).
- Now Make We Merthë: Medieval and Renaissance Carols (London, 1968).
- (with E. J. Dobson) Medieval English Songs (London, 1979).
- Motets of English Provenance (Polyphonic Music of the Fourteenth Century, vol. 15 (Monaco, 1980).
- (with Roger Wibberly) Manuscripts of 14th-Century English Polyphony: A Selection of Facsimile (Early English Church Music, vol. 26) (London, 1981).
- (with E. H. Sanders & P. M. Lefferts) English Music for Mass and Offices & Music for Other Ceremonies (Polyphonic Music of the Fourteenth Century, vols 16–17) (Monaco, 1983–6).
- Musicorum collegio: 14th-Century Musicians' Motets (Monaco, 1986).

== Writings ==
=== Books ===
- Music in Medieval Britain (London, 1958; second edition 1963; reprinted 1967, 1980).
- (with Jack A. Westrup) Collins Music Encyclopedia (London, 1959, second edition 1976).
- (with Mantle Hood & Claude V. Palisca) Musicology (Englewood Cliffs, NJ, 1963).
- (with Joan Rimmer) European Musical Instruments (London, 1964).
- Time, Place and Music: An Anthology of Ethnomusicological Observation c1550 to c1800 (Amsterdam, 1973).
- Irish Traditional Music: Fossil or Resource? (Ó Riada Memorial Lecture 3) (Cork, 1988).

=== Articles ===
- "The Eton College Choirbook", in: International Musicological Society Congress Report 5: Utrecht 1952, pp. 224–232.
- "An English 'Caput'", Music & Letters vol. 33 (1952) no. 3, pp. 203–214.
- "The Eton Choirbook: Its Background and Contents", in: Annales musicologiques vol. 1 (1953), pp. 151–175.
- "Music for the Sarum Rite: MS 1236 in the Pepys Library, Magdalene College Cambridge", in: Annales musicologiques vol. 6 (1958–63), pp. 99–144.
- "Rota and Rondellus in English Medieval Music", in: Proceedings of the Royal Musical Association vol. 86 (1959–60), pp. 98–107.
- "English Church Music in the Fourteenth Century", "English Polyphony (c1470–1540)", in: New Oxford History of Music vol. 3: Ars Nova and the Renaissance, 1300–1540, ed. Anselm Hughes & Gerald Abraham (London, 1960), pp. 82–106 & 303–348.
- "Faburden in Practice", in: Musica Disciplina vol. 16 (1962), pp. 11–34.
- "Benedicamus, Conductus, Carol: A Newly-Discovered Source", in: Acta musicologica vol. 37 (1965), pp. 35–48.
- "Tradition and Innovation in Instrumental Usage 1100–1450", in: Jan LaRue (ed.), Aspects of Medieval and Renaissance Music: A Birthday Offering to Gustave Reese (New York, 1966), pp. 319–335.
- "Ars Nova in England: A New Source", in: Musica Disciplina vol. 21 (1967), pp. 67–85.
- "Polyphony in Medieval Ireland", in: Martin Ruhnke (ed.), Festschrift Bruno Stäblein (Kassel, 1967), pp. 74–78.
- "Church Music in England", in: Gerald Abraham (ed.), New Oxford History of Music, vol. 4: The Age of Humanism, 1540–1630 (London, 1968), pp. 465–519.
- (with Joan Rimmer) "Spanish Elements in the Music of Two Maya Groups in Chiapas", in: UCLA Selected Reports in Ethnomusicology, vol. 1 (1968) no. 2, pp. 1–44.
- "The Repertory of an English Parish Church in the Early Sixteenth Century", in: Jozef Robijns (ed.), Renaissance-muziek 1400–1600: Donum natalicium René Bernard Lenaerts (Leuven, 1969), pp. 143–147.
- "Notes on the Music in the Shrewsbury Liturgical Plays", appendix to Norman Davis (ed.): Non-Cycle Plays and Fragments (London, 1970), pp. 124–133.
- "Music and Cult: The Functions of Music in Social and Religious Systems", in: Barry S. Brook, Edward O. D. Downes & Sherman van Solkema (eds), Perspectives in Musicology (New York, 1972), pp. 307–334.
- (with Joan Rimmer) "A Villancico Manuscript in Ecuador: Musical Acculturation in a Tri-Ethnic Society", Hans Heinrich Eggebrecht & Max Lütolf (eds), Studien zur Tradition in der Musik: Kurt von Fischer zum 60. Geburtstag (Munich, 1973), pp. 101–119.
- "Towards a Chronology of Celtic Folk Instruments", in: Studia Instrumentorum Musicae Popularis, vol. 4 (Stockholm, 1976), pp. 98–100.
- "Polyphonic Music for a Chapel of Edward III", in: Music & Letters, vol. 59 (1978) no. 4, pp. 420–428.
- "Tradition and Acculturation: A View of Some Musical Processes", in: Jerald C. Graue (ed.), Essays on Music for Charles Warren Fox (Rochester, NY, 1979), pp. 114–125.
- "Faburden Compositions in Early Tudor Organ Music", in: Albert Dunning (ed.), Visitatio organorum: Feestbundel voor Maarten Albert Vente (Buren, 1980), pp. 287–330.
- "Two Liturgical Manuscripts of Dutch Origin in the Bodleian Library, Oxford" and "Music for the Ordinary of the Mass in Late Medieval Netherlands", in: Tijdschrift van de Vereniging voor Nederlandse muziekgeschiedenis, vol. 32 (1982) no. 1–2, pp. 76–95.
- "Two Keyboard Intabulations of the Late 14th Century on a Manuscript Leaf Now in the Netherlands", in: Tijdschrift van de Vereniging voor Nederlandse muziekgeschiedenis, vol. 34 (1984) no. 2, pp. 97–108.
- "Observation, Elucidation, Utilisation: Western Attitudes to Eastern Musics c1600–c1830", in: Malcolm H. Brown & Roland John Wiley (eds), Slavonic and Western Music: Essays for Gerald Abraham (Ann Arbor & Oxford, 1985), pp. 5–32.
- "Music, Poetry and Polity in the Age of Swift", in: Eighteenth-Century Ireland, vol. 1 (1986), pp. 37–64.
- "Charles Coffey and Swift's Description of an Irish Feast", in: Swift Studies, vol. 1 (1986), pp. 32–38.
- "La liturgie et sa musique à la Cathédrale d'Elme au XIVme siècle", in: Miscellània litúrgica catalona, vol. 4 (1990), pp. 185–196.
- "The Musical Impact of Exploration and Cultural Encounter", in: Carol E. Robertson (ed.), Musical Repercussions of 1492: Encounters in Text and Performance (Washington, 1992), pp. 171–184.
- "Music at Oxford before 1500", in: J. I. Catto & Ralph Evans (eds), The History of the University of Oxford, vol. 2: Late Medieval Oxford (Oxford, 1992), pp. 347–372.
- "Plainsong into Polyphony: Repertoires and Structures c1270–1400", in: Susan Rankin & David Hiley (eds), Music in the Medieval English Liturgy: Plainsong & Mediaeval Music Society Centennial Essays (Oxford, 1993), pp. 303–353.

== Bibliography ==
- John Caldwell: "Frank Llewelyn Harrison (1905–1987)", in: Early Music vol. 16 (1988) no. 2, pp. 317–318.
- David F. L. Chadd: "Francis Llewellyn Harrison, 1905–1987", in: Proceedings of the British Academy, vol. 75 (1989), p. 361–380.
- Harry White: "Frank Llewelyn Harrison and the Development of Postwar Musicological Thought", in: Hermathena, vol. 146 (1989), pp. 39–47.
- Axel Klein: Die Musik Irlands im 20. Jahrhundert (Hildesheim, 1996).
- Harry White: "Francis (Frank) Llewelyn Harrison", in: The Blackwell Companion to Modern Irish Culture, ed. McCormack (Oxford, 1999).
- Axel Klein: "Harrison, Frank Llewellyn (1905–1987)", in: Ireland and the Americas: Culture, Politics and History, vol. 2, ed. Byrne, Coleman & King (Santa Barbara, CA, 2008), pp. 401–402.
- Robin Elliott: "Harrison, Frank [Francis] Llewellyn", in: The Encyclopaedia of Music in Ireland, ed. Harry White & Barra Boydell (Dublin: UCD Press, 2013), pp. 469–471.
