= Trinity College harp =

Medieval musical instrument and Irish symbol

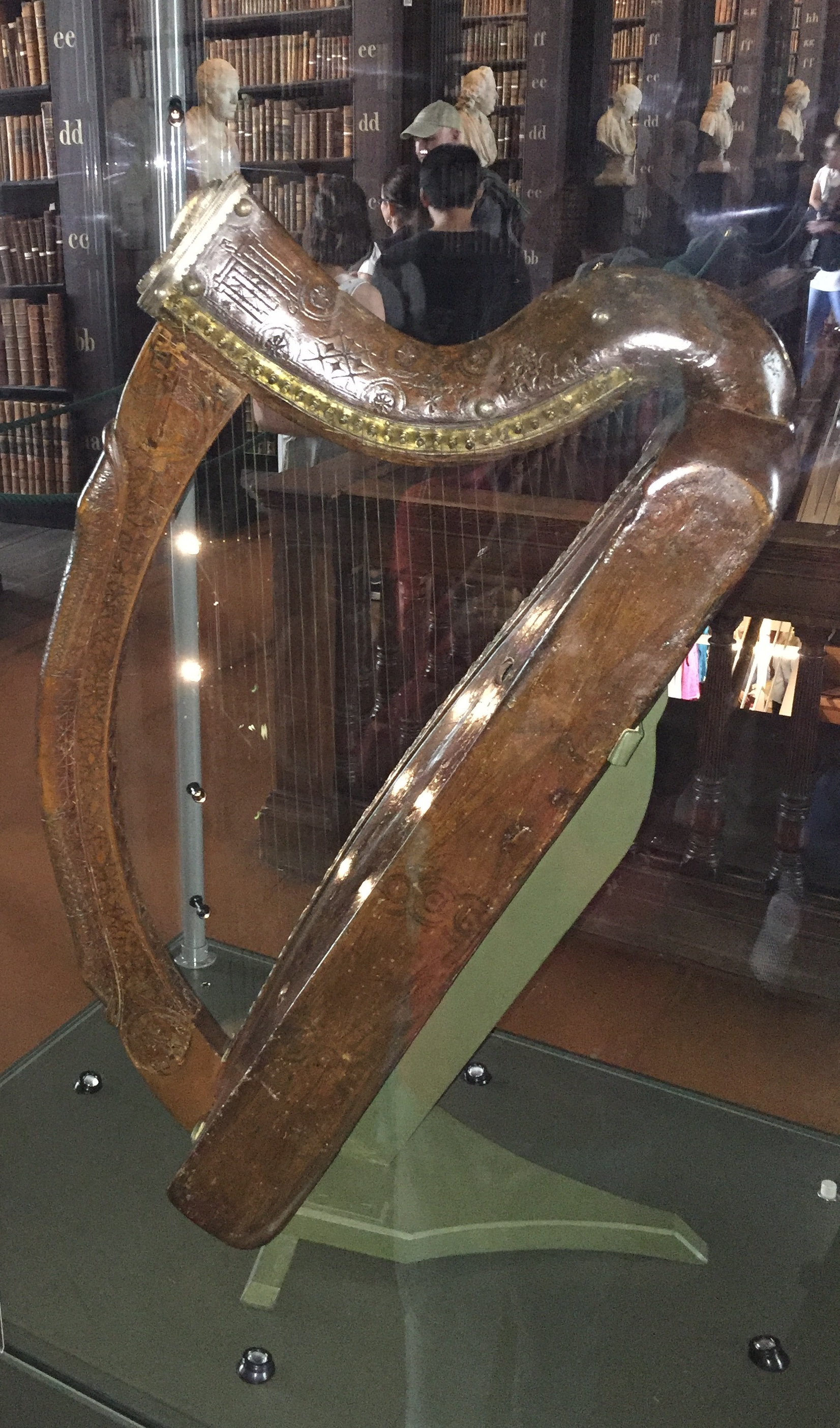
Trinity College Harp, Dublin, Ireland

The Trinity College harp, also known as "Brian Boru's harp", is a medieval musical instrument on display in the long room at Trinity College Dublin in Ireland. It is an early Irish harp or wire-strung cláirseach. It is dated to the 14th or 15th century and, along with the Queen Mary Harp and the Lamont Harp, is the oldest of three surviving medieval harps from the region. The harp was used as a model for the coat of arms of Ireland and for the trade mark of Guinness stout.

== History ==
It is uncertain who commissioned the Trinity College harp, although structural evidence suggests it was made in the fifteenth century. It is similar in construction and design to the Queen Mary Clarsach in Scotland. It is likely, however, that the harp was made for a member of an important family, for it is skilfully constructed and intricately ornamented.

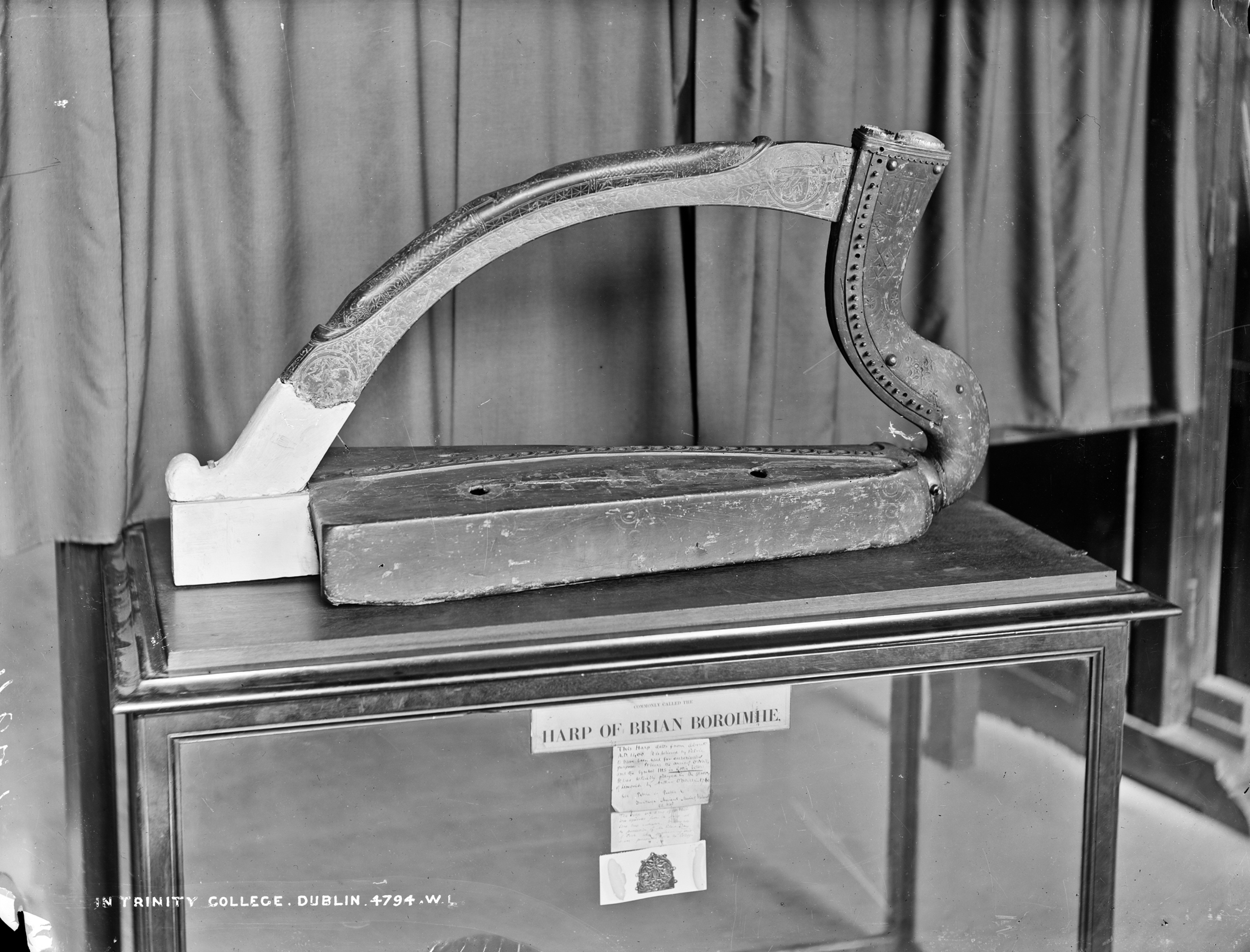
View of the harp after the 1830s restoration, but before 1960s restoration

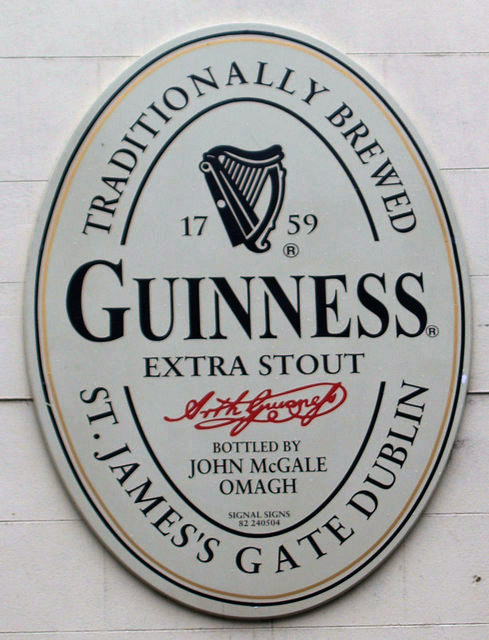
Guinness logo

According to Charles Vallancey writing in 1786, it was reputedly once owned by Brian Boru, High King of Ireland in the early eleventh century. However, this link was dismissed by George Petrie in 1840 as "a clumsy forgery, which will not bear for a moment the test of critical antiquarian examination". Petrie dates its construction "to the fourteenth, or more probably to the early part of the fifteenth century." Joan Rimmer (1969) dated it to "probably from the fourteenth century".

The harp bears the coat of arms of the O'Neills but although there are many theories about its ownership through the centuries, none can be substantiated, with no verifiable evidence remaining to indicate the harp's original owner, or subsequent owners over the next two to three hundred years until it reputedly passed to Henry McMahon of County Clare, and finally to William Conyngham, who presented it to Trinity College in 1782.

The Trinity College harp is the national symbol of Ireland, being depicted on national heraldry, Euro coins and Irish currency. A left-facing image of this instrument was used as the national symbol of Ireland from 1922, and was specifically granted to the State by the Chief Herald of Ireland in 1945. A right-facing image was registered as a trade mark for Guinness in 1876, although it was first used on their labels from 1862. Other Irish businesses have used a similar harp as a logo or trade mark, including Ryanair. The two other surviving Gaelic harps from this period (the Lamont Harp and the Queen Mary Harp) are considered to have been made in Argyll in South West Scotland sometime in the 14th–15th century.

== Appearance ==
The harp is of a small low-headed design with brass pins for 29 strings, the longest being c.62 cm. One extra bass pin was added at some point in its playing life. In 1961, the harp was exhibited in London, where it was dismantled, reconstructed by the British Museum into the wider shape it has nowadays, being the playable medieval form, and restrung under the supervision of the British musicologist Joan Rimmer. The earlier heraldic and trade mark designs that were modelled on it were based on a thinner form that was the result of a bad restoration in the 1830s. Visitors are therefore often surprised at how wide the real harp is, compared to the harp on Irish coins.
