= Shrine of St Patrick's Tooth =

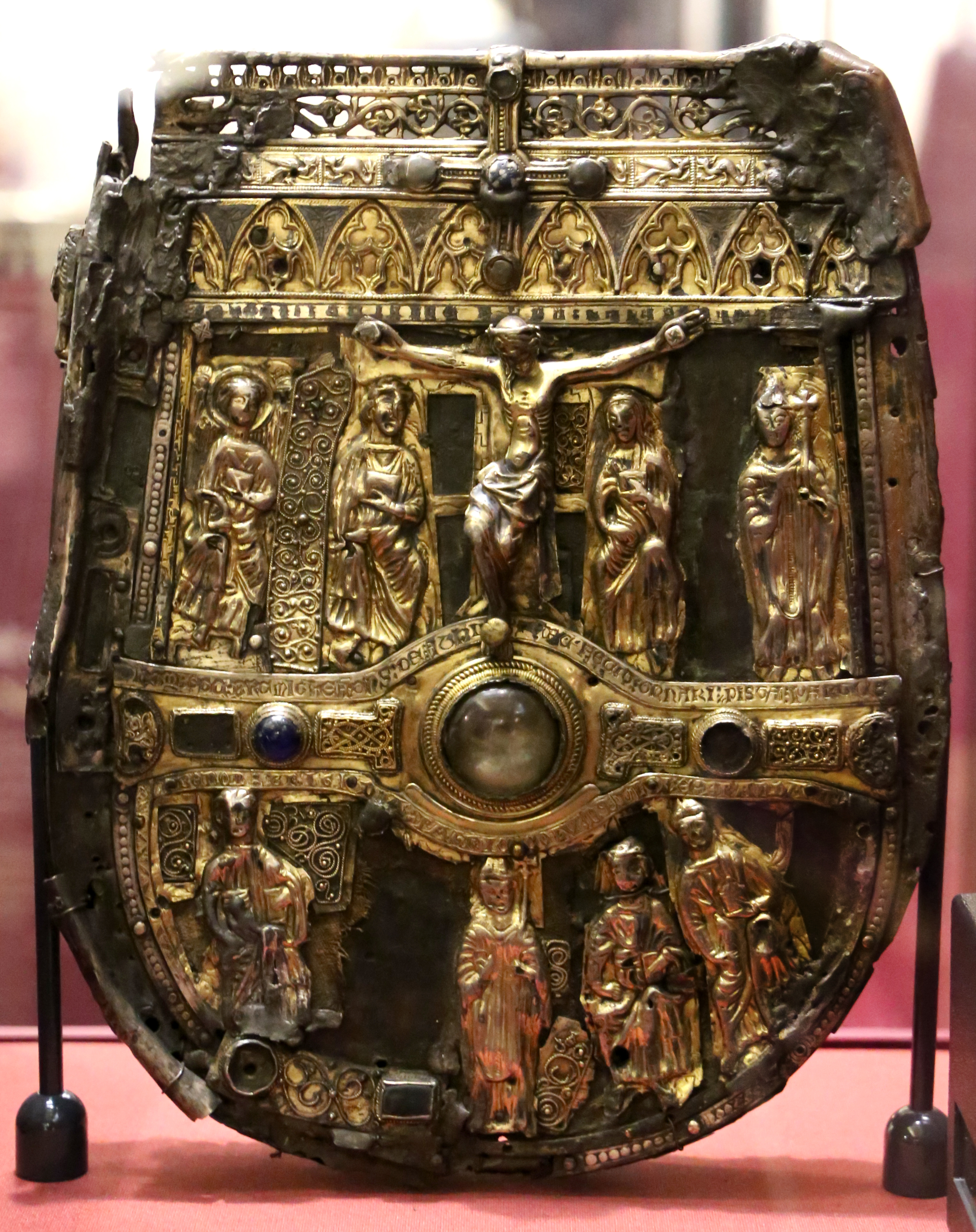
- Front panel
- Material: Wood, gold, silver, bronze, amber, coloured glass, niello
- Size: Height: 30.5 cm (12.0 in); Width: 23.5 cm (9.3 in); Depth: 6.4 cm (2.5 in)
- Created: 12th & late 14th centuries
- Discovered: Cong, County Mayo
- Present location: National Museum of Ireland, Dublin
- Identification: NMI 1887:145

The Shrine of St Patrick's Tooth (Irish: Fiacail Phádraig, translated as Patrick's Tooth) is a medieval reliquary traditionally believed to contain a tooth belonging to Patrick, Ireland's patron saint, who lived in the 5th century. The shrine comprises a wooden case lined with bronze and decorated with gold, silver and amber fittings, and was built in two phases. Its basic structure and the central ringed crosses on either side are 12th century, while the purse-shaped form and most of the metal work, including the saints, were added in the 1370s when the object was substantially refurbished.

Its two sides were again decorated in the 14th century, however the back has since suffered far more damage and losses. Only some of the figures are identifiable with specific saints. They all appear on the front, and are: on the upper register: Christ with John the Baptist to his left and Mary at right. On the lower register Benán stands to the left with an unidentified figure, while to the right are Patrick, Colmcille and Brendan.

While the shrine's provenance is unknown, it may have originated from Cong, County Mayo. According to a 9th-century hagiography, Patrick began to lose his teeth towards end of his life, and lost a number during his travels across Connacht. The tooth is believed to have been kept for an extended period at Killaspugbrone church in County Sligo, where it had supposedly fallen out. The shrine is later associated with Athenry, County Galway, and during the 18th and 19th centuries was used to cure sick animals. It was acquired by the Royal Irish Academy in 1845, and is now held at the National Museum of Ireland, Kildare Street, Dublin. An early 20th-century reproduction is in the Metropolitan Museum of Art, New York.

== Origin ==
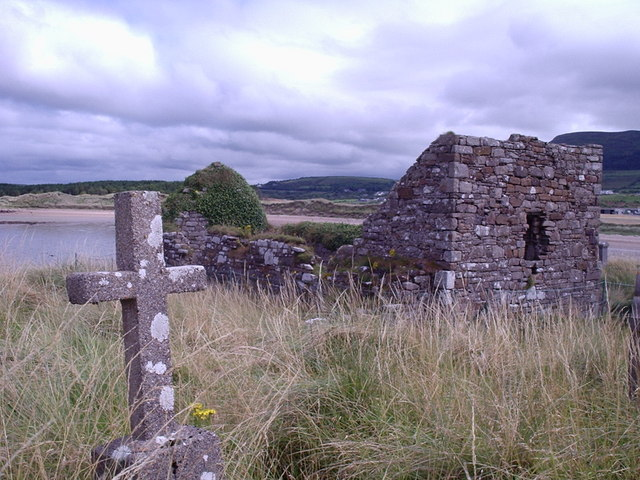
Ruin of Killaspugbrone Church

The shrine was built to contain Saint Patrick's tooth sometime after it fell out of his mouth on the doorstep of Killaspugbrone Church (also known as the Church of St. Brone), in Carbury, County Sligo. The 9th century Tripartite Life of Patrick mentions the Killaspugbrone incident. According to this hagiography, Patrick began to lose his teeth late in life, and a number that fell out during his final travels across the west coast were collected by clerics and as corporal relics became the basis for new or renamed churches. In most tellings the local bishop, Bron in Ui Fiachrach, held onto the tooth and much later commissioned a wooden case to protect it from loss or damage. The linen insert on the lower part of the front once contained a fragment of cloth and is usually assumed to have been the container for the relic,

== Description ==
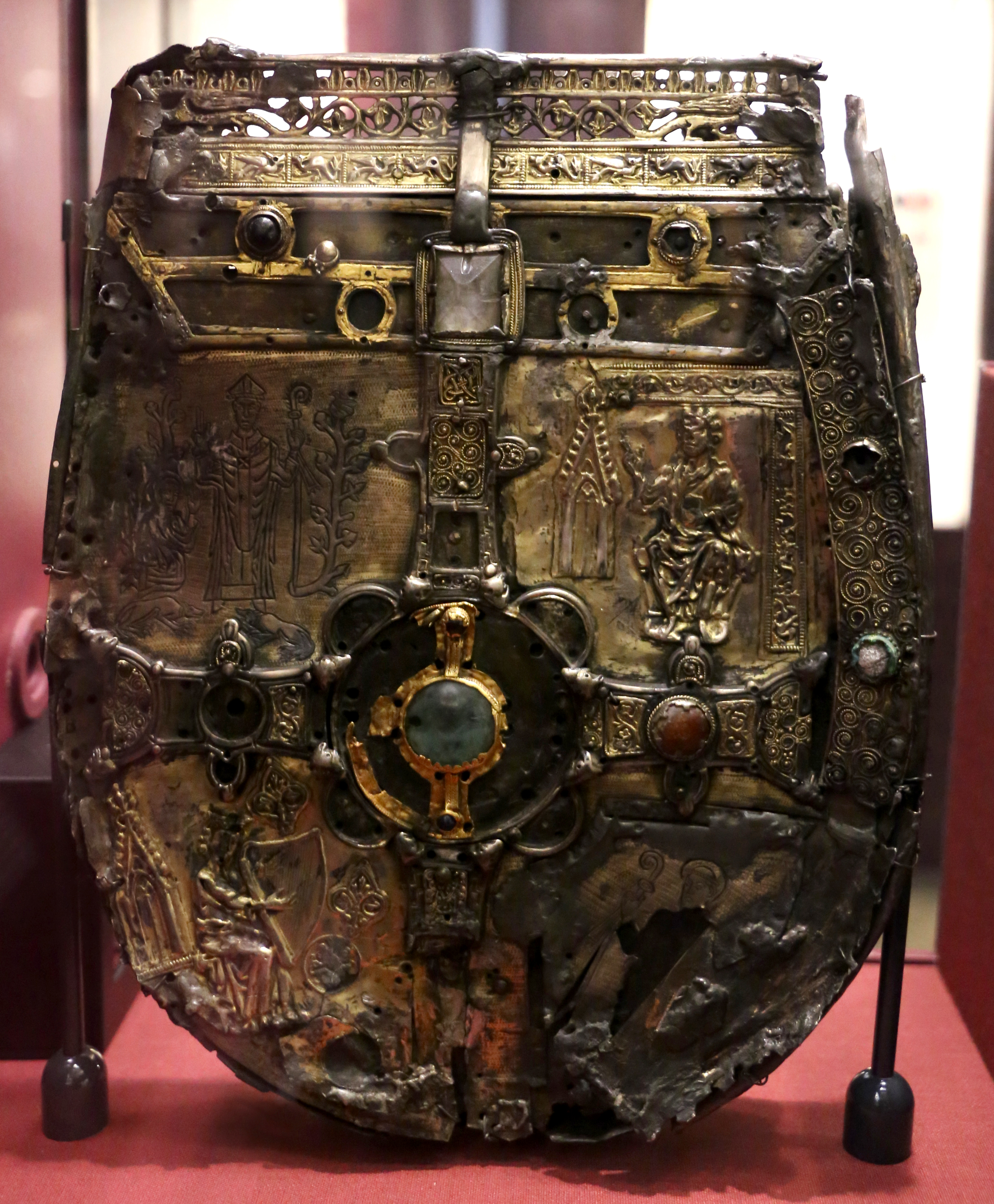
Reverse panel

The shrine is roughly shaped like a tooth, modified to also resemble a burse (a bag and purse combination), crest or shield, with a flat horizontal top and crest. Its rounded base means that it could not stand independently, and so was likely carried with a strap. Its form is unique in medieval art; its closest counterpart is a satchel worn on the neck of a figure on the Cross of Scriptures at Clonmacnoise, County Offaly.

It is constructed from a wooden case decorated with attachments in bronze, gilt-silver, gold filigree, rock crystal, amber and glass. It was built in two main phases; the 12th-century shrine had large copper crosses on either side, each of which contained a large central boss (a protruding metal knob). The cross on the front has a depiction of the crucified Christ in high relief. During the late 14th-century refurbishment, the top was lined with an openwork crest, containing a series of bas-relief (with a shallow depth) figures, filigree decorations, friezes of animals, and tracery of Gothic windows. Recent scholarship compares its first phase animal interlace and cast animal heads to other Irish 12th century Insular art object such as the Cross of Cong and Saint Manchan's Shrine, and that the objects came from the same craftsmen and workshop at Cong Abbey. However, the Shrine of St. Patrick's Tooth is relatively understudied, and the claim is made with caution.

The dating of the second phase is based on the Latin inscription that records the object was decorated for Thomas de Bermingham (d. 1376), the 6th Lord of Athenry, and his wife Isabel. The inscriptions record Thomas de Birmingham (d. 1374) as the commissioner for the refurbishment. It reads "THOMAS DE : BRAMIGHEM : DNS : DE ATHUNRY / ME FECIT ORNARI PISCA PARTE" (Thomas de Bermingham, Lord of Athenry, caused me to be ornamented in the original portion). It further records that the refurbishment followed the original design — "ornari p[r]isca parte" (in the original proportion). The upper line of the inscription is embossed, while the lower line has raised characters written in Insular script.

=== Front ===
The front is dominated a first phase crossbar and a large central crystal, with smaller surrounding crystal, glass and amber settings. The figure of Christ and array of saints were added in the second phase, and are all in repoussé with the finer details added by engraving and niello (a black mixture used as an inlay on engraved or etched metal) used to delineate the figures. The saints are dressed like high status ecclesiastic but are shown without any of their usual symbols or emblems. They can be identified from inscriptions on the gilt-bronze strips above their heads. Christ is in far higher relief than the saints. On either side of him are John the Baptist (left) and Mary (right), who are in turn flanked by two unidentified saints. The surrounding between John and Christ, as well as that around the figure right of Mary are now lost. Representations of Colmcille, Benán, Brendan and the now lost figure of Brigid of Kildare on are on the lower lower register. Patrick is positioned directly below Christ, indicating his national importance. To the left are Columba and Brendan, and to the right Benán.

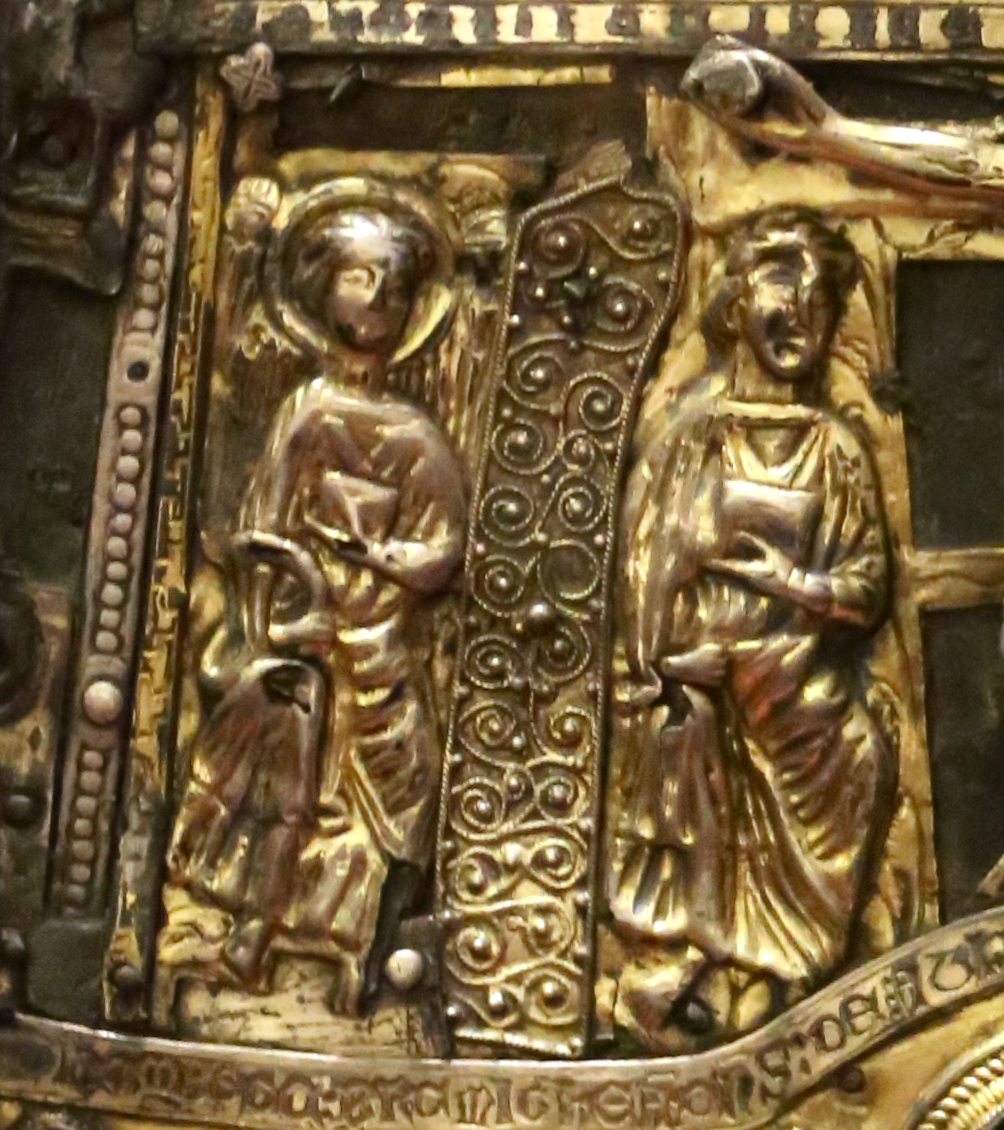
Unidentified saint and John separated by spiral patterns and surrounded on three sides by engravings

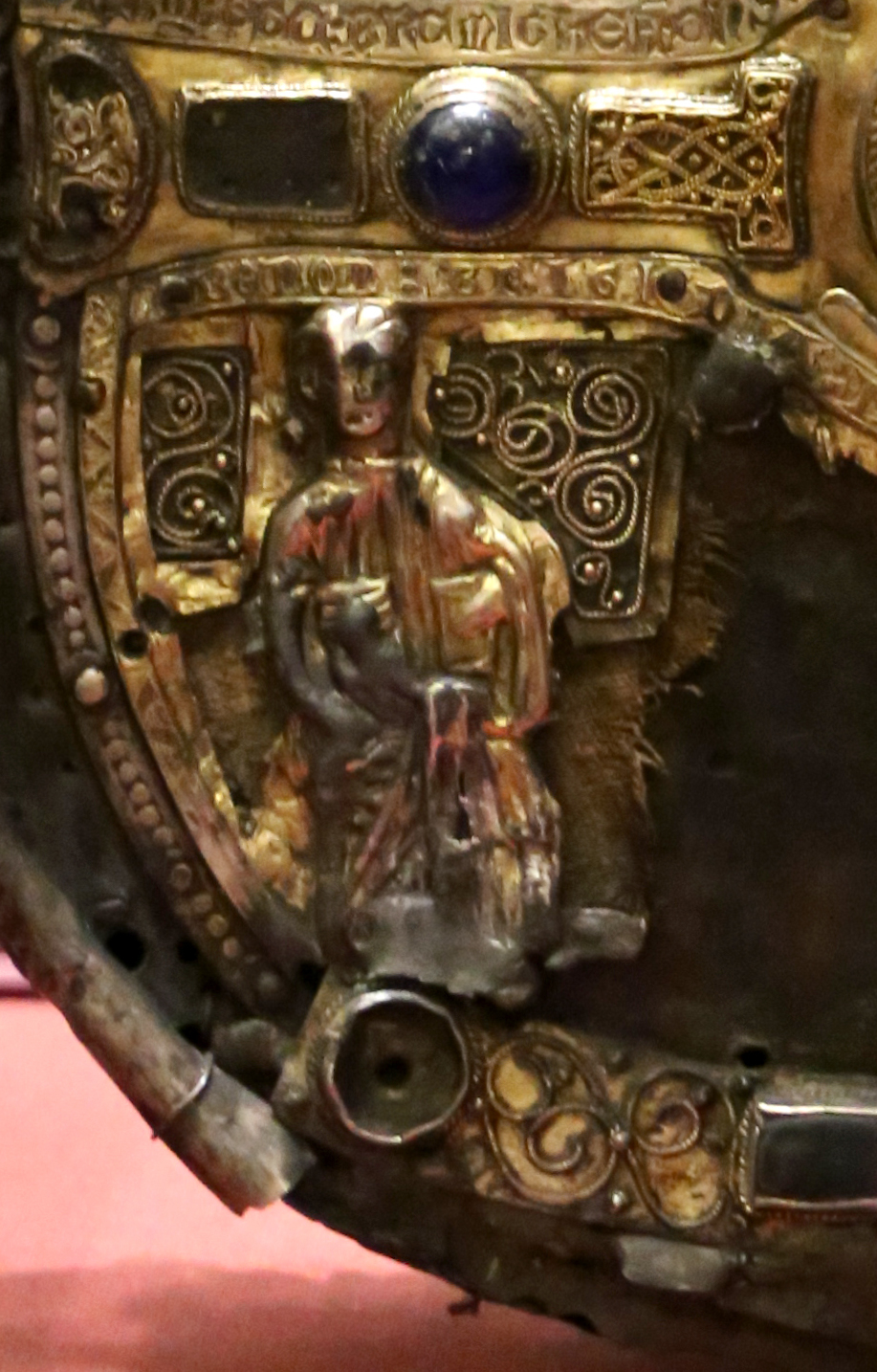
Benán on the lower left

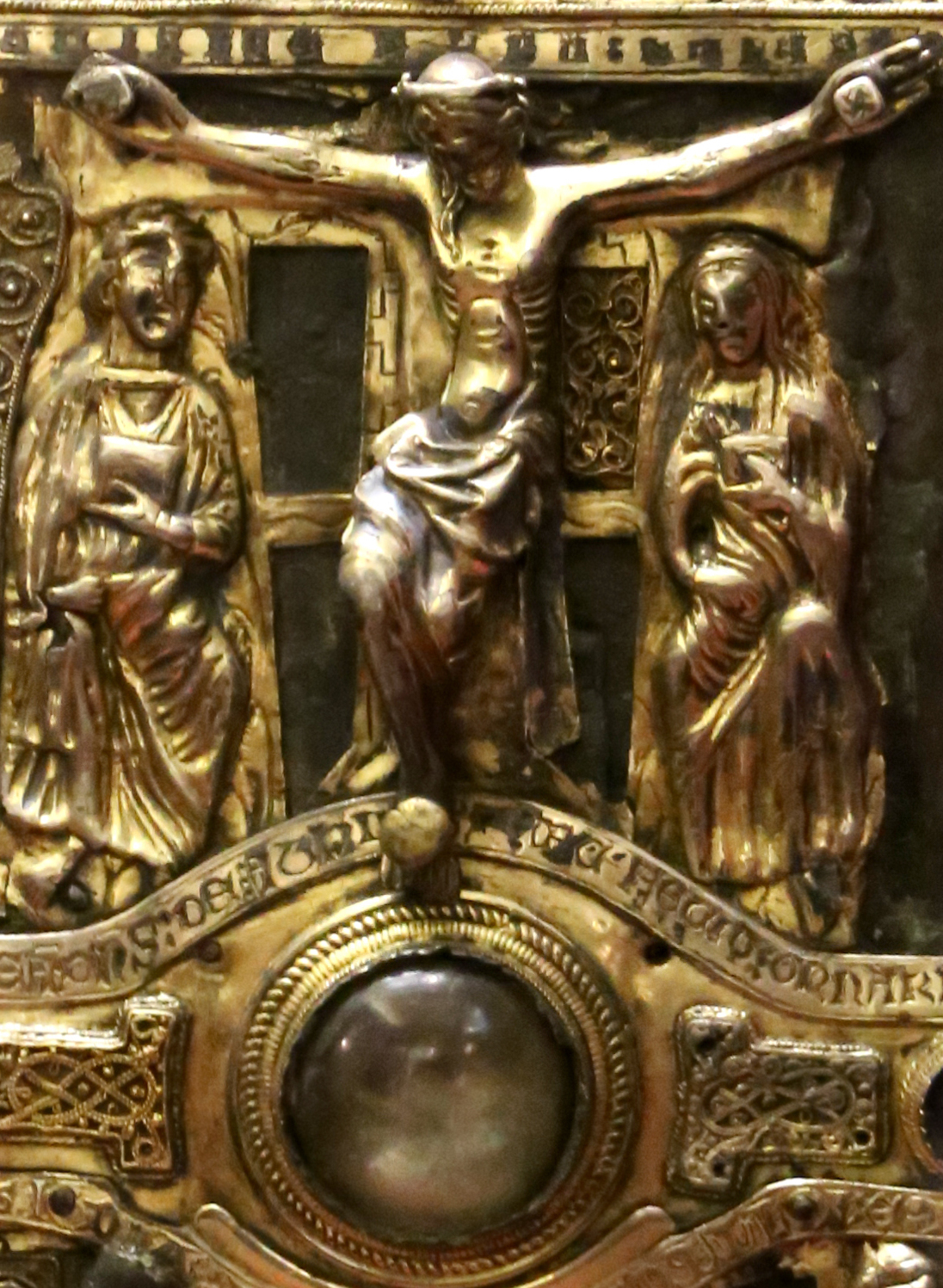
Crucifixion and central rock crystal boss. John the Baptist is to the left, Mary to the right

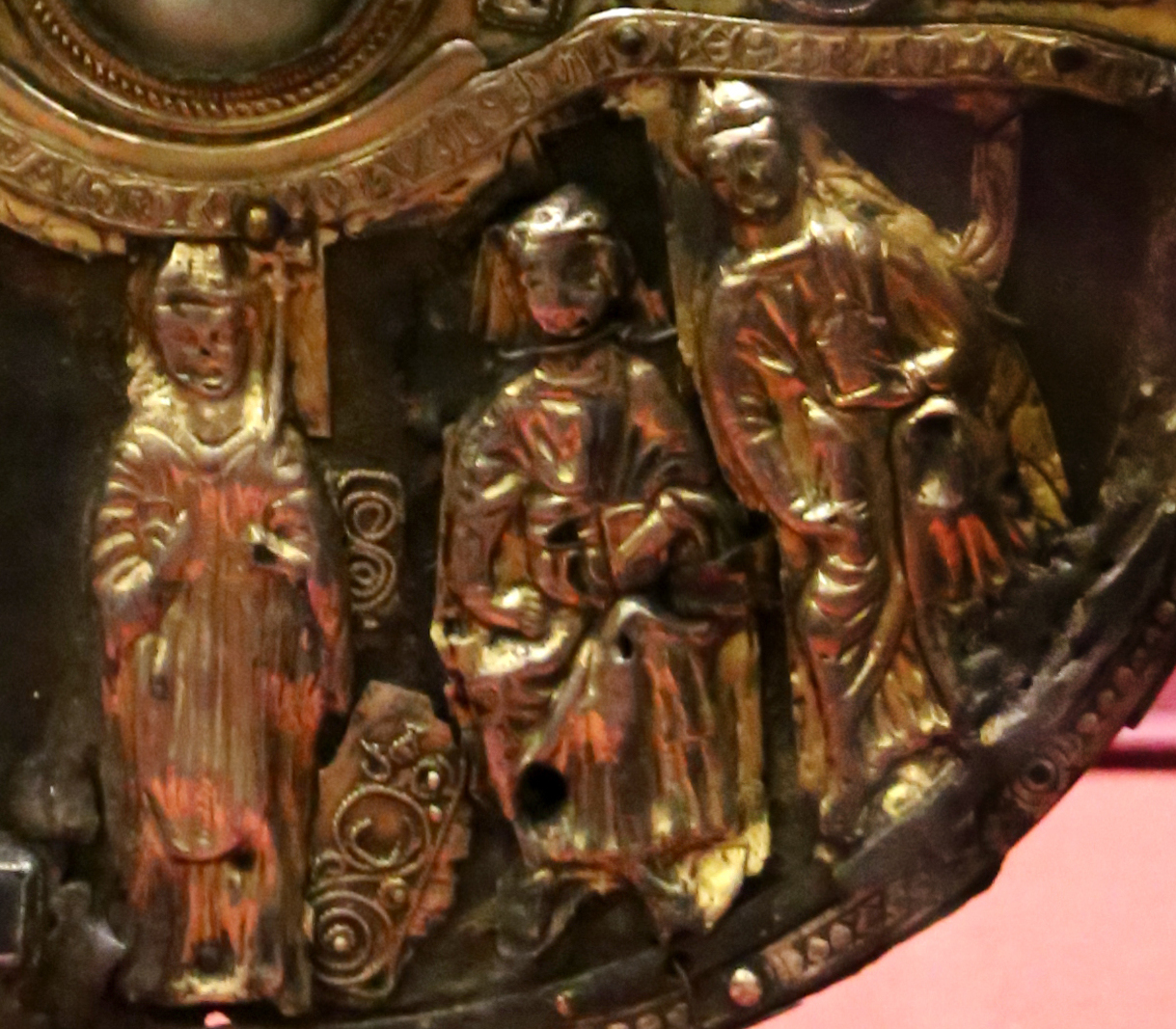
Patrick, Colmcille and Brendan

The row of animal heads between the cross arms and central boss seem to be mice, similar to another row on the Cross of Cong and Manchan's Shrine. A row of trefoil arches and patterns separate the upper and lower registers of saints.

=== Reverse ===
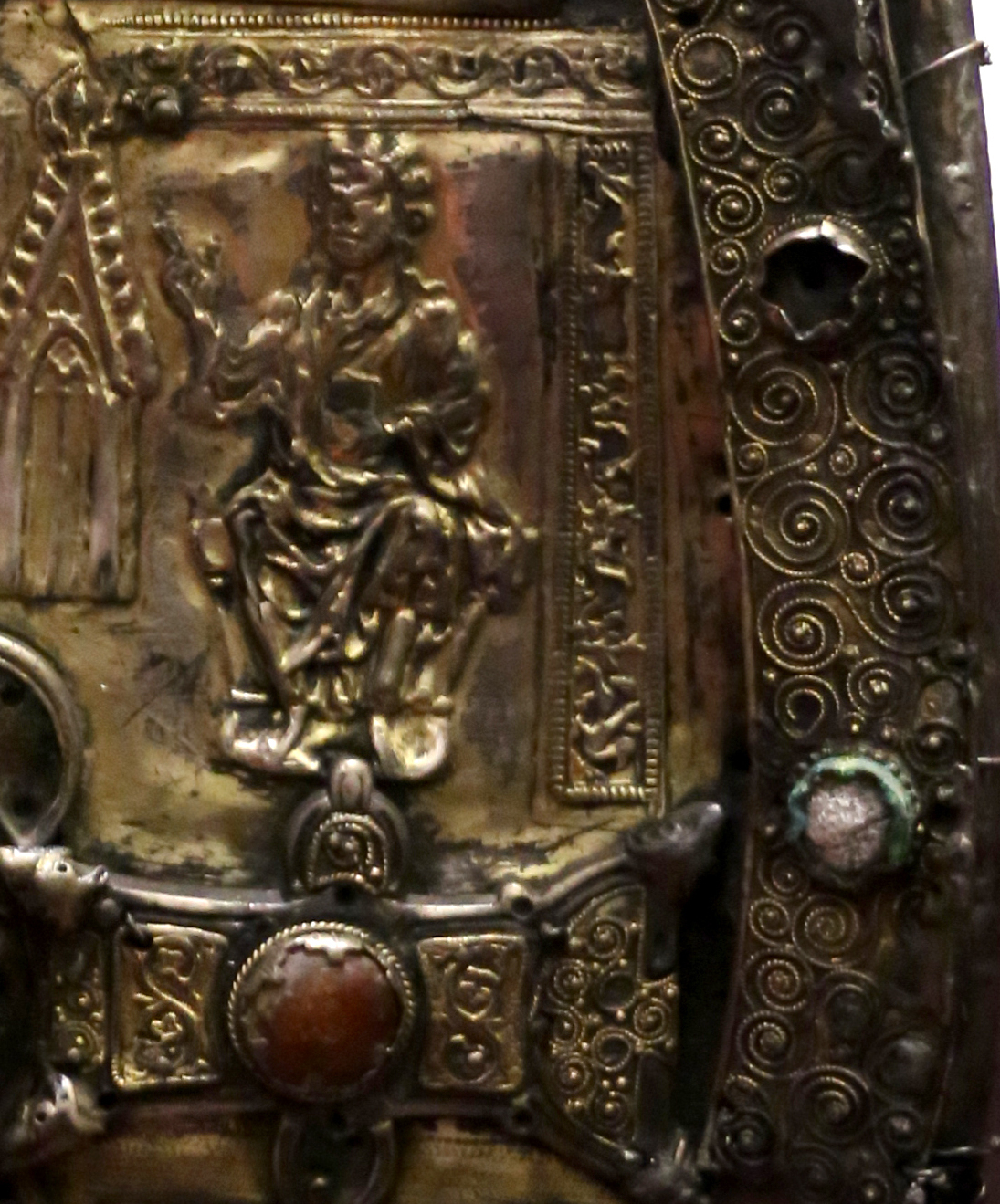
Seated figure with arm raised in benediction, surrounded by spiral patterns and filigree

The reverse was once as decorated as the front but has suffered far more damaged and losses. It is also dominated by a first phase central cross, which unlike the front, does not show Christ. The cross is surrounded by four figures also achieved by repoussé and dye-stamping; two in relief and two engraved on silver plates. Unlike those on the front, these figures do not have inscribed banners giving their names and can only be described generically as a bishop or abbot holding a crozier (top left), a seated man with an arm raised in blessing (top right), a harper (lower left) and a badly damaged figure with a halo and holding a crozier (lower right).

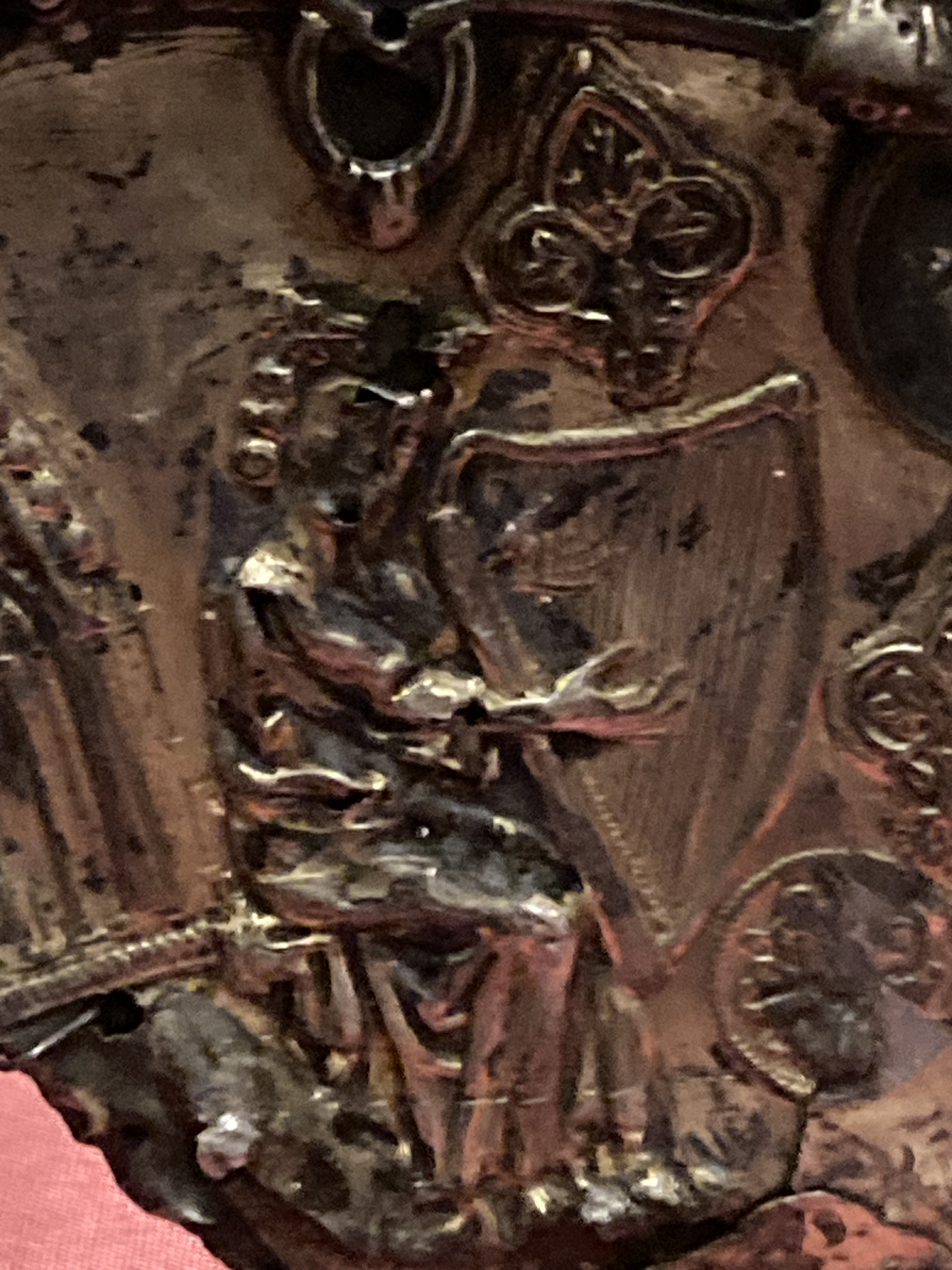
Detail of the harpist.

The harpist —who may be either male or female— is usually described as the most noteworthy of the figures, given that it is, along with the 11th century Breac Maodhóg, one of the earliest depictions of a Celtic harp. The panel is badly damaged. Positioned on the lower left, they are seated and play a large, 23-string harp. The instrument is triangular with a carved fore-pillar (the column joining the neck and soundbox), and held in place between the knees and left shoulder. The musician, who may represent King David, uses their left hand to play bass and their right to pluck the higher strings.

== Provenance ==
The shrine first appears in historical records in a 17th-century survey of Connacht, where it is described as the most "venerated object" in the region. It is mentioned again in the early 19th century when it was under the care of Patrick Prendergast, then a parish priest at Cong, County Mayo. According to the surgeon and antiquarian William Wilde, Prendergast collected a number of early medieval relics, including the tooth and Cross of Cong. Wilde wrote the first detailed description of the shrine and its provenance in 1872.

It was displayed by Margaret Stokes in the mid-19th century. It was acquired by the Royal Irish Academy in 1845, and donated as part of its transfer to the National Museum of Ireland.
