= Joan Rimmer =

British musicologist

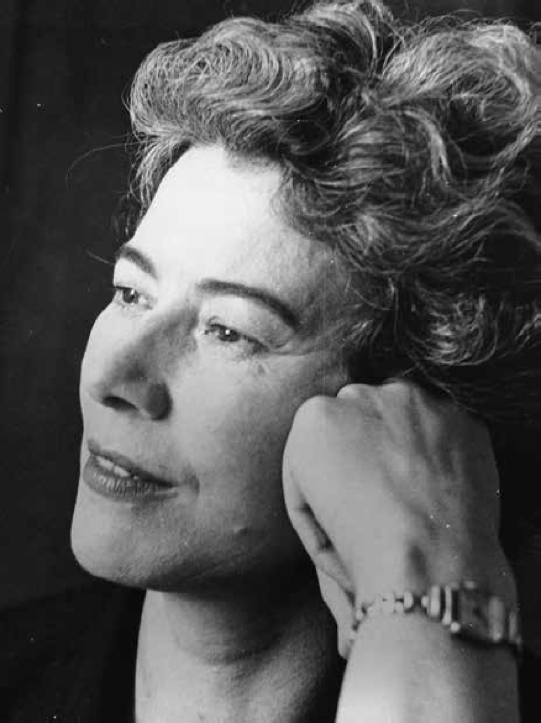
- Rimmer circa 1970
- Born: 11 December 1918; London
- Died: 29 December 2014 (age 96); Whitstable, Kent

Joan Rimmer (11 December 1918 – 29 December 2014) was an English musicologist who specialised in the history of musical instruments (especially the Irish harp) and in historical dance forms. She was also a pioneer in ethnomusicology who presented, in the course of 30 years, numerous programmes on traditional music from around the world on BBC radio.

== Life and career ==
Rimmer was born in the Battersea district of London, to Marion (née Layzell), a bookkeeper, and Edmund Rimmer, a musician, and grew up in Kensington. At age 12, she gained a scholarship to the Royal College of Music where she later studied piano with Cyril Smith and won the Hopkinson Gold Medal, graduating in 1939. She became a music teacher at Putney High School and Roehampton Training College while also giving public piano recitals.

In 1948, Rimmer began a long association with the BBC, which lasted about 30 years. Initially she was a station pianist, presented educational programmes for children, and produced BBC LPs, including one with Spike Milligan. By the mid-1950s, her programmes were increasingly occupied with historical musicology and organology, producing programmes on bagpipes, harps, and (in 1957) on the Chinese sheng and a Chinese variant of the shawm. Ethnomusicological subjects have always been her interest: One of her first BBC programmes was on music making at shepherds' festivals in Asturias, Spain, produced with her own field recordings.

In 1949, she married James McGillivray, then an oboist in the Royal Philharmonic Orchestra; and was divorced by 1962. From 1957, she was on the Committee of the Galpin Society and was its Assistant Secretary from 1960 to 1968. In this role, in 1961, she was responsible for the restoration and restringing of the so-called "Brian Boru harp" in Trinity College Dublin, in association with the British Museum. This led to a number of research publications on Irish harps, including the seminal book The Irish Harp (1969), the standard work on the subject for many years. This book established today's terminology and classification of Irish harps.

Rimmer re-married in 1965, in Los Angeles, with the Irish musicologist Frank Ll. Harrison (1905–1987), then a professor at Oxford. She accompanied Harrison to his various visiting professorships to Stanford, Dartmouth, and Princeton during the 1960s. At Stanford, the couple began a 20-year friendship with Frank Zappa. Rimmer and Harrison together developed an increasing interest in ethnomusicology, with common research trips to Mexico, Central and South America, making recordings of the music-making of indigenous people. During this time, she participated in the establishment of ethnomusicology as an academic discipline at the Institute of Ethnomusicology at the University of California where she published under her married name, Joan Harrison, on Spanish elements in the music of Maya groups in Chiapas, Mexico. This research interest led to Harrison quitting his position at Oxford in 1970 and taking up a professorship in ethnomusicology at the University of Amsterdam in the Netherlands. At all times, Rimmer pursued her own research, now also including music and musical instruments of this country, which resulted in a noted series of publications.

In 1976, the couple relocated to Canterbury, where Harrison died in 1987. In addition to her innovative work on musical instruments and in developing the field of ethnomusicology, in her 70s she was breaking new ground in the study of historical dance. At the age of 80 she was still publishing research papers and was on the editorial board of the journal Dance Research.

Joan Rimmer died in Whitstable, Kent, aged 96.

== Publications ==
=== Books ===
- Rimmer, Joan (1977). The Irish Harp. Ireland. Cultural Relations Committee (3rd, 1984 ed.). Cork: Mercier Press for the Cultural Relations Committee. ISBN 0-85342-151-X. OCLC 5099900.
- Rimmer, Joan (1969). Ancient Musical Instruments of Western Asia in the Department of Western Asiatic Antiquities, the British Museum. British Museum. Department of Western Asiatic Antiquities. London. ISBN 0-7141-1045-0. OCLC 59650.
- Two Dance Collections from Friesland and their Scotch, English and Continental Connections (Groningen: Frysk Ynstitut oan de Rykuniversiteit to Grins, 1978).

(with Frank Ll. Harrison)

- Antique Musical Instruments and Their Players. 152 Plates from Bonanni's 18th-Century "Gabinetto Armonico" (London: Constable and New York: Dover, 1964).
- European Musical Instruments (London: Studio Vista and New York: W. W. Norton, 1964).

=== Articles ===
- "James Talbot's Manuscript (Christ Church Library Music MS 1187): VI. Harps" in: The Galpin Society Journal vol. 16 (1963), May, pp. 63–72.
- "Harps in the Baroque Era", in: Journal of the Royal Musical Association vol. 90 (1963), no. 1, pp. 59–75.
- "The Morphology of the Irish Harp", in: The Galpin Society Journal vol. 17 (1964), February, pp. 33–49.
- "The Morphology of the Triple Harp", in: The Galpin Society Journal vol. 18 (1965), March, pp. 90–103.
- "The Morphology of the Triple Harp II: Addendum on a Late Italian Example", in: The Galpin Society Journal vol. 19 (1966), April, pp. 61–64.
- (with Frank Ll. Harrison) "Spanish Elements in the Music of Two Maya Groups in Chiapas", in: UCLA Selected Reports in Ethnomusicology vol. 1 (1968) no. 2, pp. 1–44.
- (with Frank Ll. Harrison) "A Villancico Manuscript in Ecuador: Musical Acculturation in a Tri-Ethnic Society", Hans Heinrich Eggebrecht & Max Lütolf (eds), Studien zur Tradition in der Musik: Kurt von Fischer zum 60. Geburtstag (Munich, 1973), pp. 101–119.
- "The Tibiae pares of Mook", in: The Galpin Society Journal vol. 29 (1976) May, pp. 42–46.
- ""Schotsen" in the Netherlands, 1700–1978", in: Tijdschrift van de Vereniging voor Nederlandse Muziekgeschiedenis, vol. 29 (1976), no. 1, pp. 38–58.
- "Tabac Pipes from Aardenburg and Goedereede: Some Musical Implications", in: Berichten van de Rijksdienst voor het Oudheidkundig Bodemonderzoek vol. 29 (1979), pp. 527–535.
- "An archaeo‐organological survey of the Netherlands", in: World Archaeology vol. 12 (1981) no. 3, pp. 233–245.
- "Dans en dansmuziek in Nederland in de 18de eeuw", in: Spiegel historiael vol. 19 (1984), pp. 387–390.
- "Dance Elements in Trouvère Repertory", in: Dance Research vol. 3 (1985) no. 2, pp. 23–34.
- "Dance and Dance Music in the Netherlands in the 18th Century", in: Early Music, vol. 14 (1986), no. 2, pp. 209–220.
- "Edward Jones's Musical and Poetical Relicks of the Welsh Bards, 1784: A Re-Assessment", in: The Galpin Society Journal vol. 39 (1986), September, pp. 77–96.
- "Patronage, Style and Structure in the Music Attributed to Turlough Carolan", in: Early Music vol. 15 (1987) no. 2, pp. 164–174.
- "Allemande, Balletto and Tanz", in: Music & Letters vol. 70 (1989) no. 2, pp. 226–232.
- "Carole, Rondeau and Branle in Ireland 1300–1800. Part 1: The Walling of New Ross and Dance Texts in the Red Book of Ossory", in: Dance Research vol. 7 (1989) no. 1, pp. 20–46.
- "Carole, Rondeau & Branle in Ireland 1300–1800. Part 2: Social and Theatrical Residues 1550–1800", in: Dance Research vol. 8 (1990) no. 2, pp. 27–43.
- "Medieval Instrumental Dance Music", in: Music & Letters vol. 72 (1991) no. 1, pp. 61–68.
- "Harp Repertoire in Eighteenth-Century Ireland: Perceptions, Misconceptions and Reworkings", in: Martin van Scheik (ed.): Aspects of the Historical Harp. Proceedings of the International Historical Harps Symposium, Utrecht 1992 (Utrecht: STIMU Foundation for Historical Performance Practice, 1994), pp. 73–85.
- "Harp Function in Irish Eulogy and Complaint: Two Late Examples", in: The Galpin Society Journal vol. 50 (1997), March, pp. 109–118.
- "Anthony Cuthbert Baines, 1912–1997: A Biographical Memoir", in: The Galpin Society Journal vol. 52 (1999), April, pp. 11–26.

== Bibliography ==
- Lawlor, Helen (2012). Irish harping, 1900-2010 : 'it is new strung'. Dublin: Four Courts Press. ISBN 978-1-84682-367-1. OCLC 779880099.
- O'Donnell, Mary Louise (2014). Ireland's harp : the shaping of Irish identity, c. 1770-1880. Dublin. ISBN 978-1-906359-86-7. OCLC 894611317.
- Obituaries by Penny Vera-Sanso in The Guardian, 24 April 2015; The Galpin Society Journal, vol. 69 (2016), April, pp. 245–247 [no full text available online]; Folk Music Journal vol. 11 (2016), pp. 115ff [no full text available online]; website of British Forum for Ethnomusicology.
