= Killaspugbrone =

Early Christian church in Ireland

Coordinates: 54°16′58″N 8°36′08″W

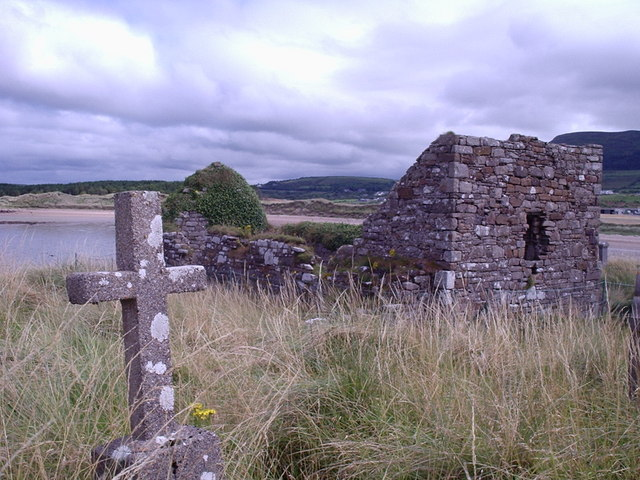
The ruin of Killaspugbrone Church

Killaspugbrone (Irish: Cill Easpaig Bhróin, meaning 'the church of Bishop Brón') is an early Christian church on the coast west of Sligo town and near the modern resort of Strandhill. Known as Caiseal Irrae in the earliest references. One of the earliest churches in Sligo, it was founded by Bishop Brón mac Icni (died 512) a contemporary of St. Patrick. The church is in a townland and civil parish of the same name.

== History ==
This church was a major pilgrimage site that contained a relic of St. Patrick known as the Fiacail Pádraig, now in the National Museum of Ireland. According to Patricks biographer Tirechán in his Collectanea, Patrick prophesied that the sea would force his heirs to move closer to the river Sligo, now the Garavoge (see Sligo).

"And they came to Trácht Authuili into the territory of Ira, Patrick and Brón, and with them Macc Erce Maicc Dregin, to the plain, that is, Ros Dregnige, where there is the chasuble of Brón, and as Patrick was sitting there a tooth fell out of his mouth, and he gave it to Brón as a relic. And he said: 'Behold, the sea will drive us out of this place in the last times, and you will go to the wood by the Sligo River."

== Church ==
The present building dates to the 12th century. The church was the victim of Viking attack, perhaps the same expedition that assaulted Inishmurray. It is the subject of an ongoing preservation initiative by the Killaspugbrone Preservation Society.

== Sources ==
- Crawford, Henry. "A Descriptive List of Irish Shrines and Reliquaries. Part I". The Journal of the Royal Society of Antiquaries of Ireland, 6th series, volume 13, no. 1, June 1923. JSTOR 25513282
- Moss, Rachel. Medieval c. 400—c. 1600, "Art and Architecture of Ireland" series. London: Yale University Press, 2014. ISBN 978-03-001-7919-4
- Wilde, William. Lough Corrib, Its Shores Islands: with Notices Lough Mask. Oxford: Oxford University, 1867
