= Queen Mary Harp =

Medieval musical instrument from Scotland

Coordinates: 55.947°N 3.189°W

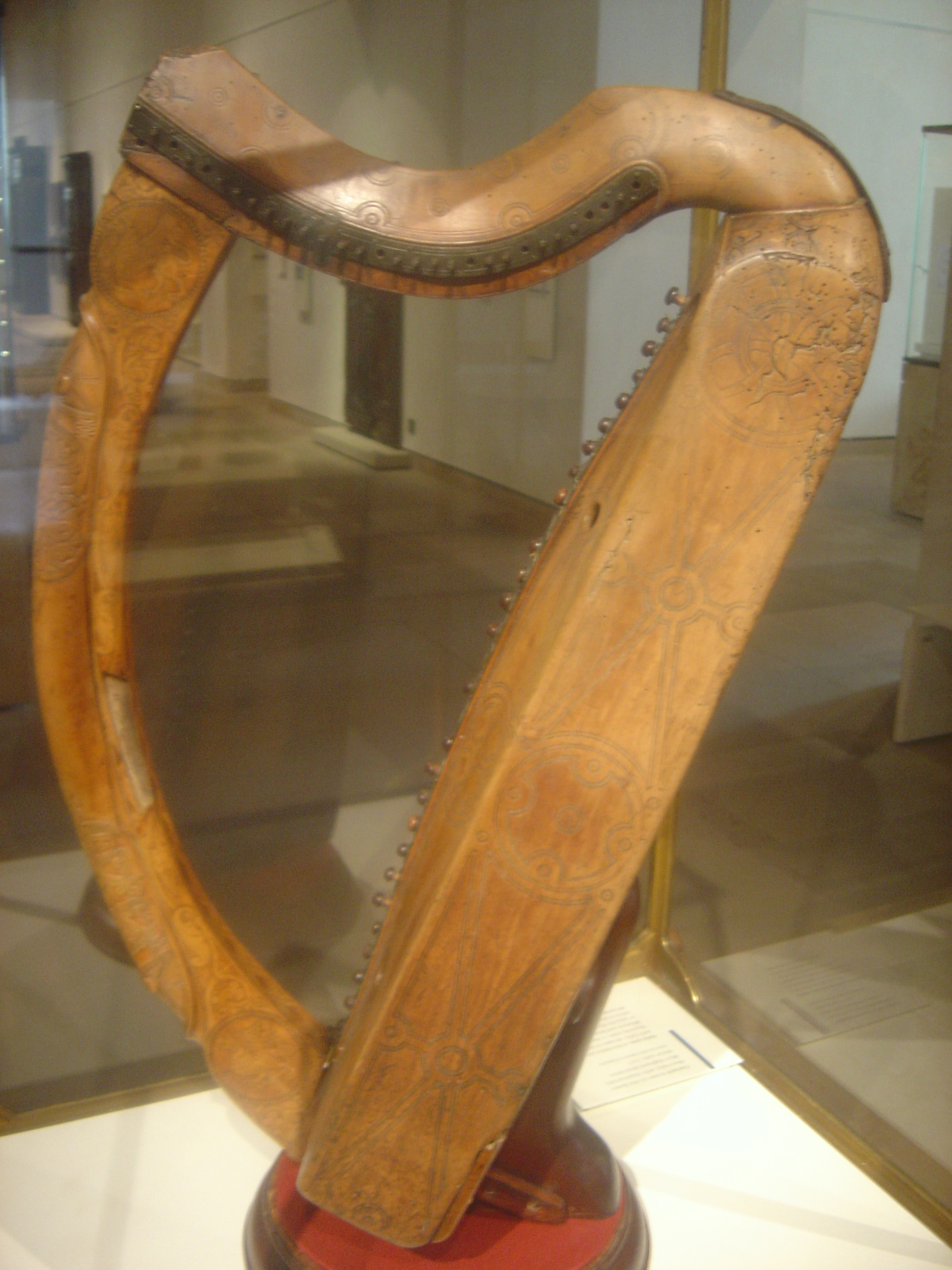
The original harp, preserved in the National Museum of Scotland, Edinburgh

The Queen Mary Harp (Scottish Gaelic: Clàrsach na Banrìgh Màiri) or Lude Harp, is a Scottish clarsach currently displayed in the National Museum of Scotland. It is believed to date back to the 15th century, and to have originated in Argyll, in South West Scotland. It is one of the three oldest surviving Gaelic harps, the others being the Lamont Harp and the Trinity College Harp.

== History ==
The Queen Mary Harp dates from 1500 and was presented to the harper Beatrix Gardyn of Banchory in 1563 by Mary, Queen of Scots, while on a hunting trip. It is also said to have been adorned at one time with a gold portrait of Mary which is why the harp is associated with the queen of Scots and was subsequently passed down into the Robertson family of Lude, in Perthshire. Lady Gardyn's son had a servant in 1588 called Anthony McEwan McChlairser ("son of the harper"), which provides a clue as to who might have played this clarsach. The last harpist to play the instrument is noted as John Robertson of Lude (died c. 1729); his repertory was preserved in the family and published by John Bowie in 1789. All three surviving Gaelic harps are considered to have been made in Argyll in South-West Scotland at some time in the 14th or 15th centuries.

== Appearance ==
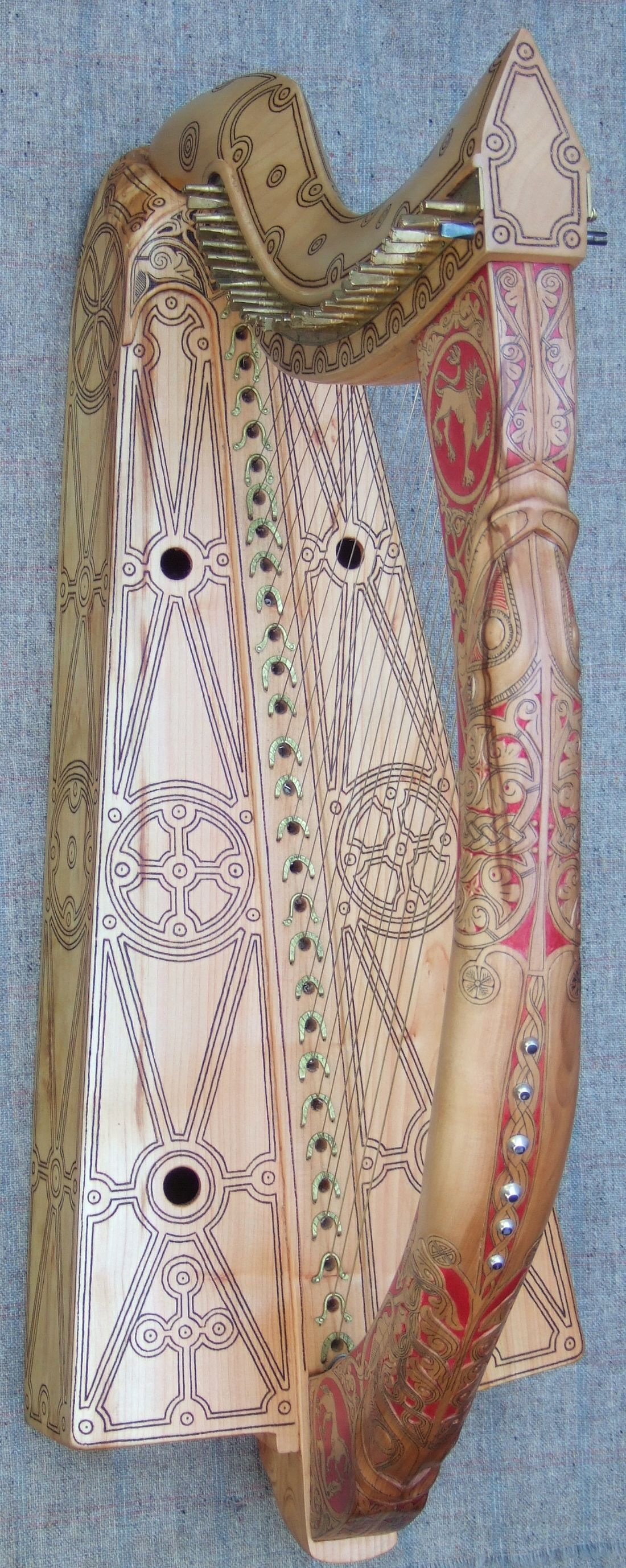
Replica of the harp by Davy Patton, 2007

The Queen Mary harp is noted for being the most complete and best-preserved of all the old harps. It is covered in original and intricate carving. The forepillar or Lamhchrann is elaborately carved with a double-headed zoomorphic figure and the instrument retains traces of pigment. Some traces have been analyzed and identified as vermilion. The decoration includes a number of pieces of Christian symbolism suggesting that the harp may have been made as a commission for a church or monastery. The vine-scrolls and the particular shape of the "split palmette" leaves have clear parallels with 15th century West Highland grave slabs from the Argyll area, suggesting that this is the time and place that the harp originated. A grave-slab in the chapel at Keills in Knapdale has a carving of a harp similar in appearance to the Queen Mary.
