= Winterlude (disambiguation) =

Winterlude is an annual winter festival held in Canada's National Capital Region.

Winterlude may also refer to:

- Winterlude (film), a 1996 film
- Winterlude, a 1982 book of poems by Vernon Scannell
- "Winterlude", a song by Bob Dylan from the 1970 album New Morning
- "Winterlude", a song by Al Di Meola from the 1999 album Winter Nights

== See also ==
- Winterhude
