= Multi-course harp =

Harp with more than one row of strings

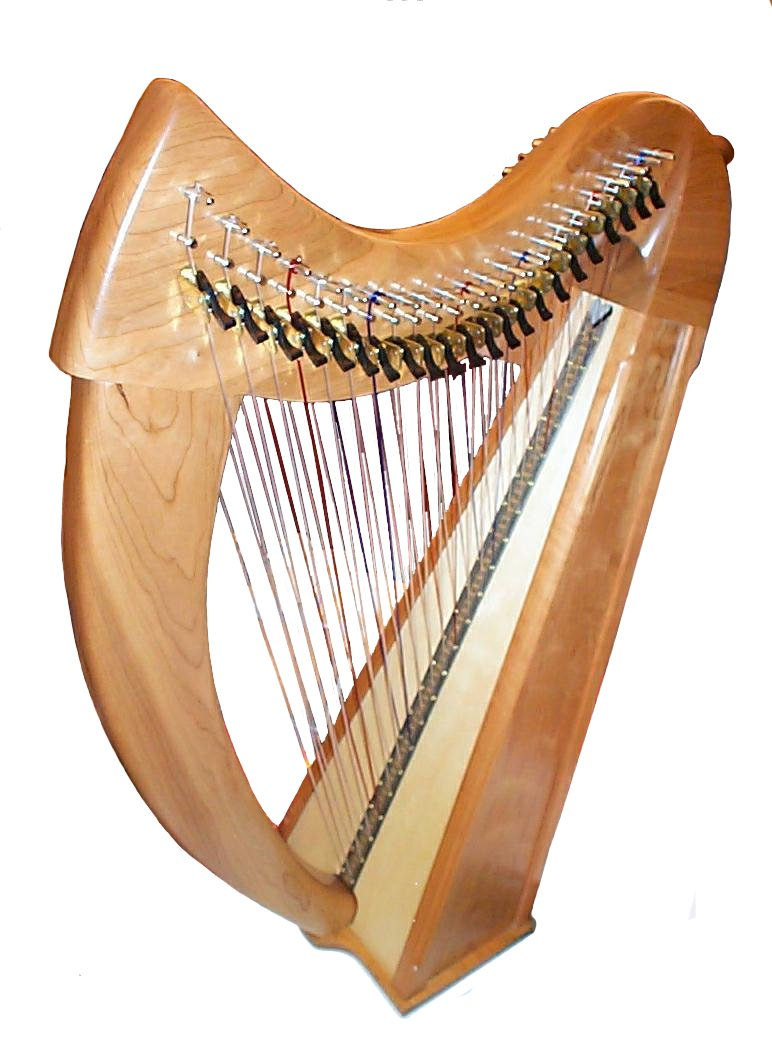
A small diatonic double harp.

A multi-course harp is a harp with more than one row of strings. Harps with two rows are called double harps; harps with three rows are called triple harps. A harp with only one row of strings is called a single-course harp.

== Diatonic double harps ==
A diatonic double-strung harp consists of two rows of diatonic strings one on either side of the neck. These strings may run parallel to each other or may converge so the bottom ends of the strings are very close together. Either way, the strings that are next to each other are tuned to the same note. Double-strung harps often have levers either on every string or on the most commonly sharped strings, for example C and F. Having two sets of strings allows the harpist's left and right hands to occupy the same range of notes without having both hands attempt to play the same string at the same time. It also allows for special effects such as repeating a note very quickly without stopping the sound from the previous note.

Diatonic double harps can also be tuned in octaves to allow for an extended range on small instruments.

== Chromatic double and triple harps ==
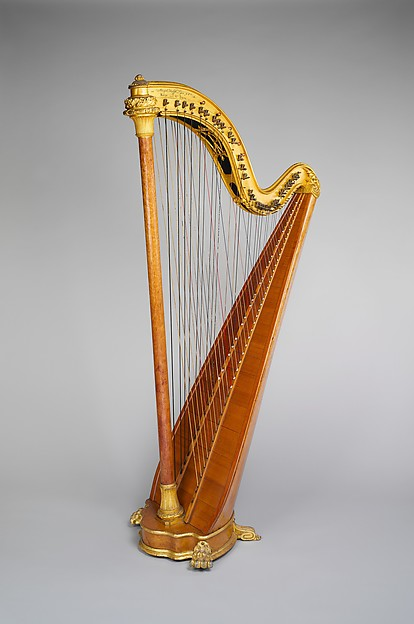
A French cross-strung chromatic harp.

Chromatic double and triple harps have one row of strings that is tuned pentatonically to allow for chromatic playing. These harps exist both as parallel chromatic harps or as cross-strung harps.

=== Parallel chromatic double and triple harps ===
These harps have the strings strung in parallel, and are not to be confused with inline chromatic harps.

A triple harp features three rows of parallel strings, two outer rows of diatonic strings, and a center row of chromatic strings. To play a sharp, the harpist reaches in between the strings in either outer row and plucks the center row string. Like the double-strung harp, the two outer rows of strings are tuned the same, but the triple-strung harp has no levers.

This harp originated in Italy in the 16th century as a low headed instrument, and towards the end of 17th century it arrived in Wales where it developed a high head and larger size as the Welsh triple harp. It established itself as part of Welsh tradition and became known as the Welsh harp (telyn deires, "three-row harp"). The traditional design has all of the strings strung from the left side of the neck, but modern neck designs have the two outer rows of strings strung from opposite sides of the neck to greatly reduce the tendency for the neck to roll over to the left.

=== Cross-strung harps ===
Cross-strung harps have two rows of strings that intersect in the middle.
