= Winter Nights (album) =

Studio album by Al Di Meola
- Released: October 14, 1999
- Genre: Jazz
- Length: 50:53
- Label: Telarc
- Producer: Al Di Meola: Hernan Romero

Al Di Meola chronology
The Infinite Desire (1998)	Winter Nights (1999)	World Sinfonía III – The Grande Passion (2000)

Professional ratings
Review scores
Source	Rating
Allmusic	3/5 stars

Winter Nights is an album by jazz guitarist Al Di Meola released in 1999.

== Track listing ==
1. "Zima" (Al di Meola) – 4:05
2. "Carol of the Bells" – 4:11
3. "Winterlude Duet No. 1" (Roman Hrynkiv, Al di Meola) – 1:27
4. "Greensleeves" (Traditional) – 2:46
5. "Mercy Street" (Peter Gabriel) – 4:52
6. "Have Yourself a Merry Little Christmas" (Ralph Blane, Hugh Martin) – 4:32
7. "Winterlude No. 2" (Roman Hrynkiv) – 0:51
8. "Midwinter Nights" (Al di Meola) – 4:50
9. "Scarborough Fair" (Traditional) – 4:36
10. "Winterlude No. 3" (Roman Hrynkiv) – 0:47
11. "The First Noel" (William Sandys) – 3:13
12. "Inverno" (Al di Meola) – 5:38
13. "First Snow" (Al di Meola) – 2:43
14. "Winterlude No. 4" (Al di Meola) – 1:31
15. "Ave Maria" (Bach/Gounod) – 4:51

== Personnel ==
Musicians

- Al Di Meola – acoustic guitars (1–6, 8, 9, 11–13, 15), percussion (1, 4–6, 8, 9, 11–13, 15), keyboards (2, 4, 9, 11, 13), multi-string harp (2), cajon (4, 6), dumbek (4), tambur (5)
- Roman Hrynkiv – bandura (1, 3, 5, 7, 8, 10–14)
- Hernan Romero – additional percussion (1, 12), shaker (4), background acoustic guitar (5)

Production

- Robert Woods – executive producer
- Al Di Meola – producer, arrangements, mixing, liner notes
- Hernan Romero – co-producer, mixing
- Spyros Poulos – engineer, recording, mixing, digital editing
- Rich Tozzoli – engineer, recording, mixing
- Michael Bishop – mastering
- Anilda Carrasquillo – art direction, cover design
- Thomas Macko – illustration, cover lettering
- Bill Hickey – inside photography

== Chart performance ==
Year	Chart	Position
1999	Billboard Top Contemporary Jazz Albums	15
