= Harp =

Plucked string instrument

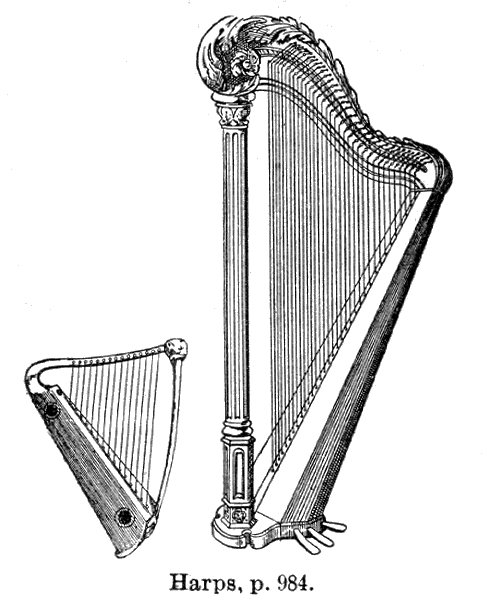
- A medieval harp (left) and a single-action pedal harp (right)

String instrument
- Hornbostel–Sachs classification: 322–5 (Composite chordophone sounded by the bare fingers)

Playing range
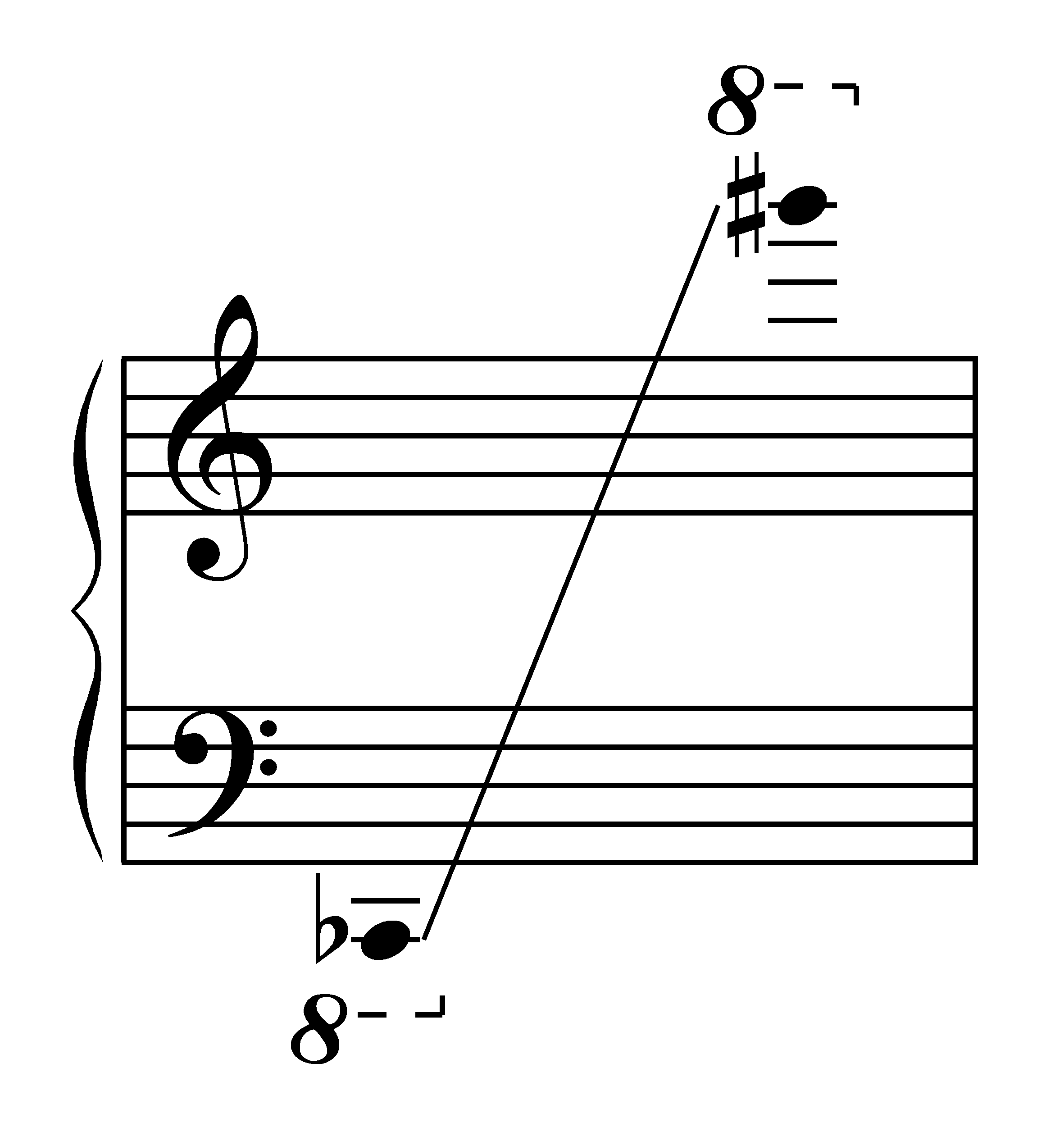
- (modern pedal harp)

Related instruments
- Angular harp; Arched harp; Claviharp; Konghou (Chinese); Pedal harp; Triple harp (Baroque era); Celtic harp (Medieval era); Medieval harp; Epigonion; Lyre; Yazh; Zither; Chang (instrument)

The harp is a stringed musical instrument that has individual strings running at an angle to its soundboard; the strings are plucked with the fingers. Harps can be played in either a seated or standing position. Most commonly, harps are made of wood and are triangular in shape. Some have multiple rows of strings and pedal attachments.

Ancient depictions of harps were recorded in Mesopotamia (Iraq), Persia (Iran) and Egypt, and later in India and China. By medieval times, harps had spread across Europe. Harps are found across the Americas; in some regions, they are used in traditional folk music. Distinct designs also emerged from the African continent. Harps have symbolic political traditions and are often used in logos, including in Ireland.

Historically, strings were made of sinew (animal tendons). Other materials have included gut (animal intestines), plant fibre, braided hemp, cotton cord, silk, nylon, and wire.

== History ==
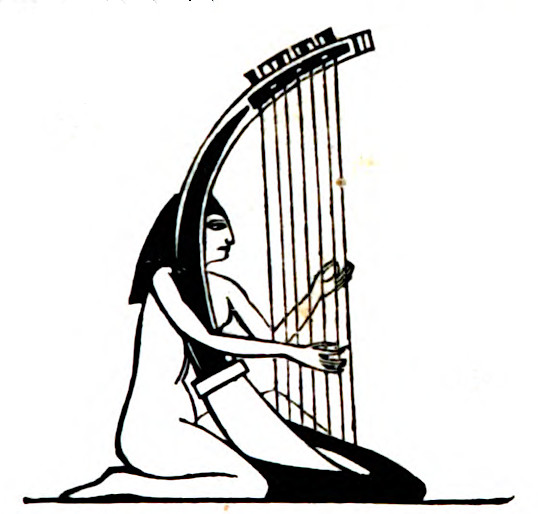
An Egyptian vertical harp, kneeling harper

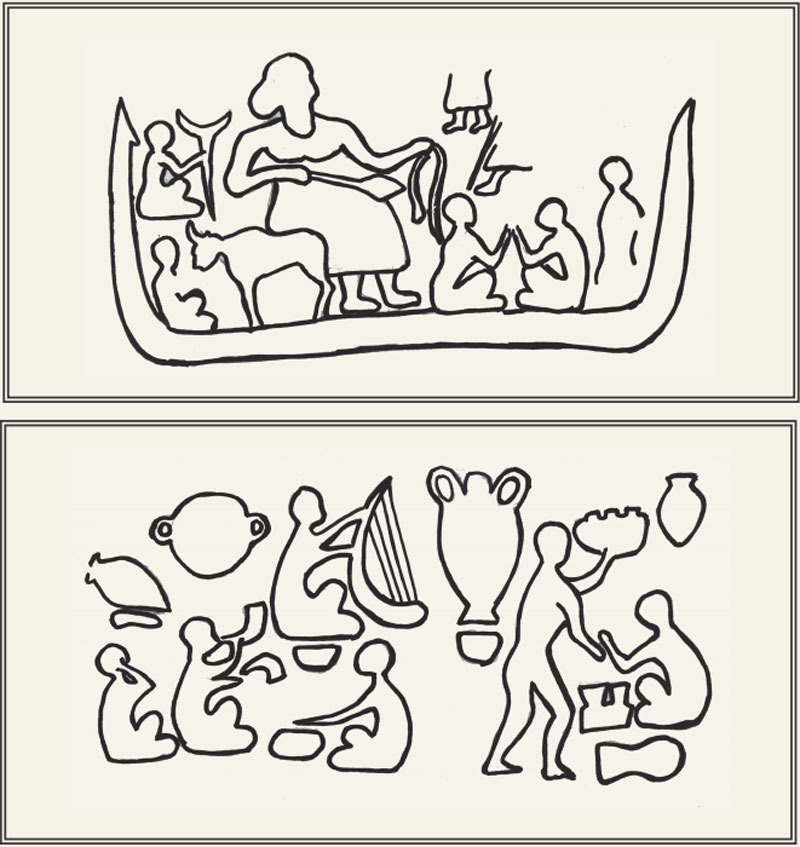
The Harps of Chogha Mish in Iran are considered to be the world's oldest surviving stringed instruments, 3300–3100 BCE

Harps have been known since antiquity in Asia, Africa, and Europe, dating back at least as early as 3000 BCE. The instrument had great popularity in Europe during the Middle Ages and the Renaissance, where it evolved into a wide range of variants with new technologies, and was disseminated to Europe's colonies, finding particular popularity in Latin America.

Although some ancient members of the harp family died out in the Near East and South Asia, descendants of early harps are still played in Myanmar and parts of Africa; other variants defunct in Europe and Asia have been used by folk musicians in the modern era.

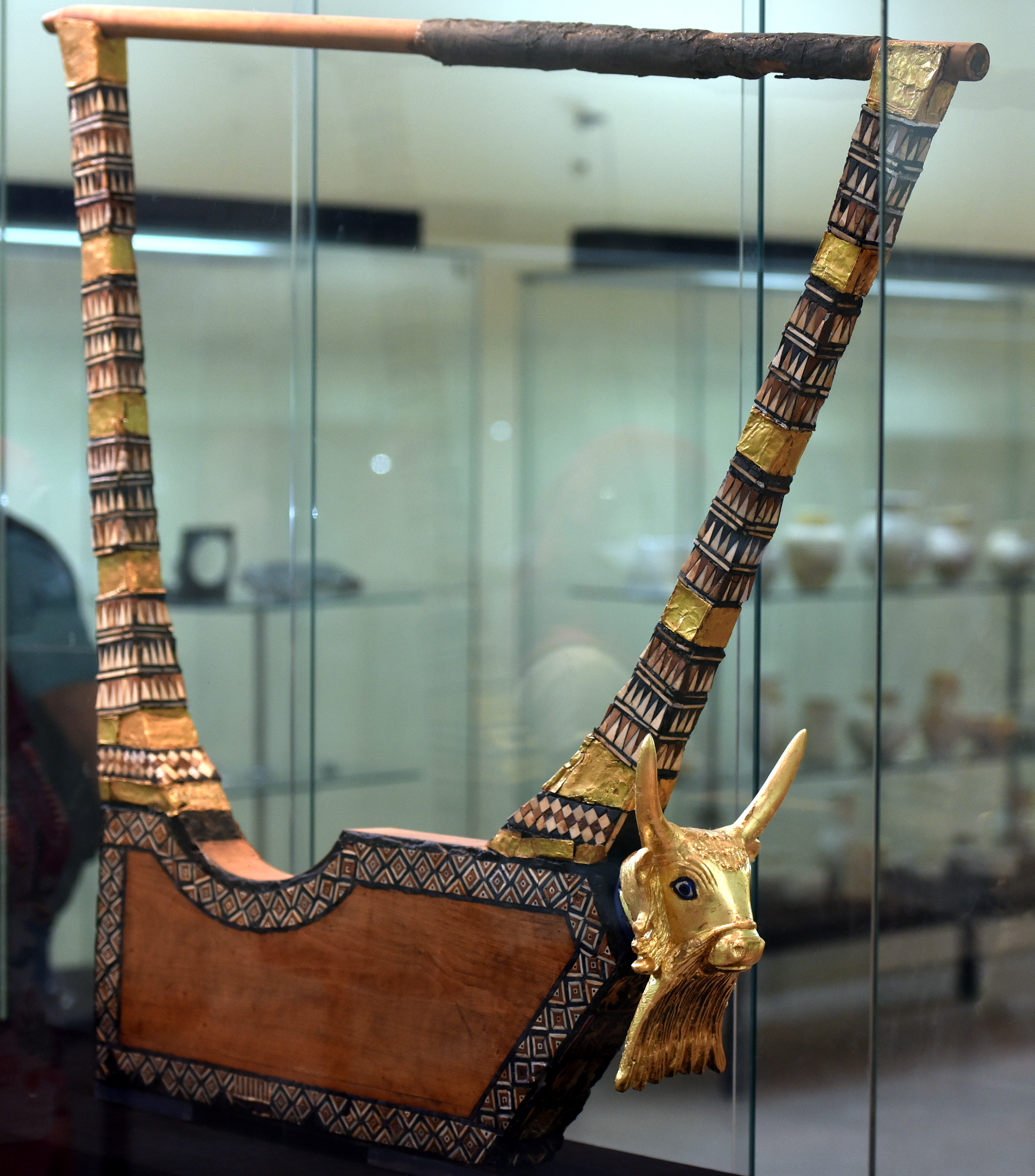
The Queen's gold lyre from the Royal Cemetery at Ur, c. 2500 BCE; Iraq Museum, Baghdad

=== Origin ===
==== West Asia and Egypt ====
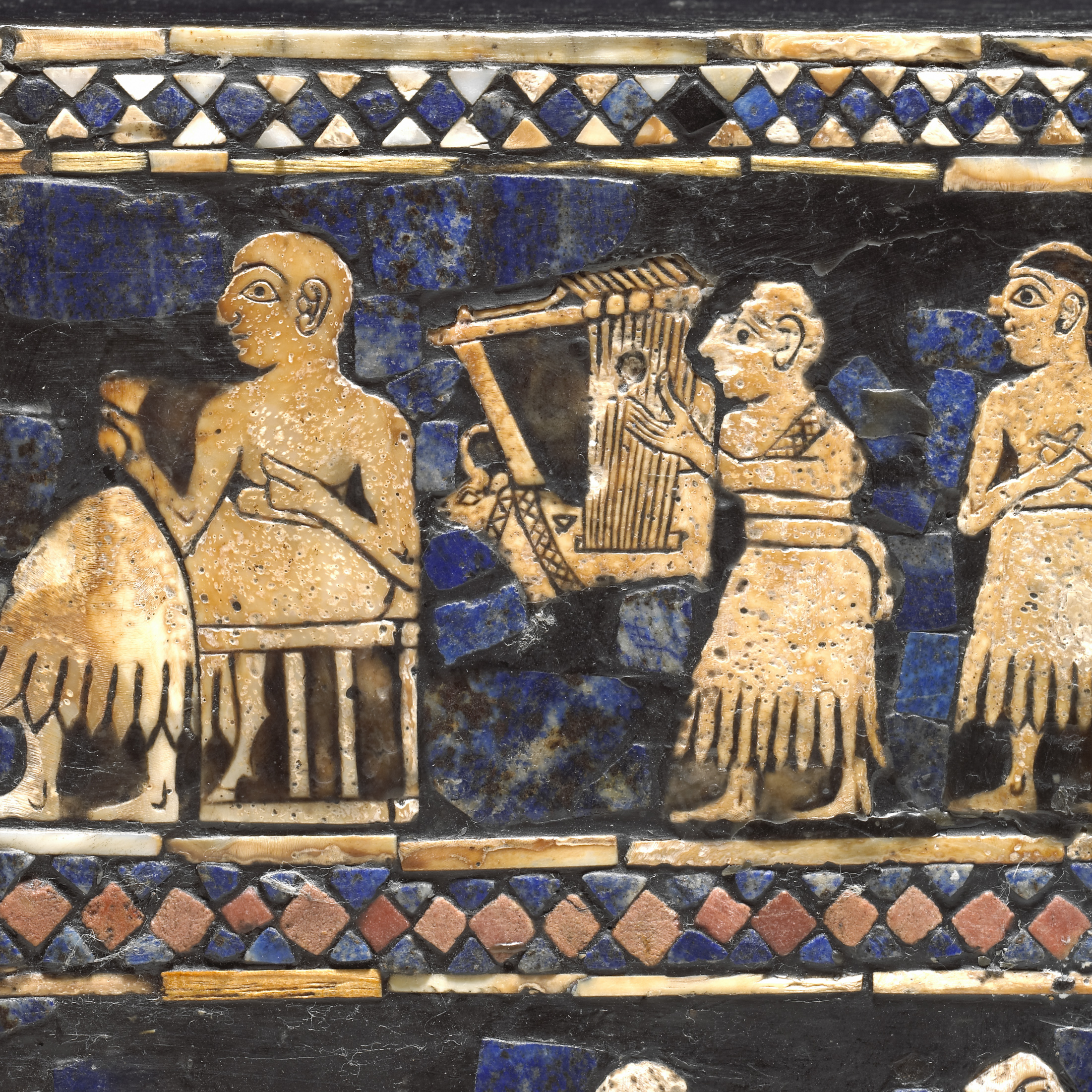
Lyres of Ur

The earliest harps and lyres were found in Sumer, c. 2500 BCE, with several harps excavated from burial pits and royal tombs in Ur. The oldest depictions of harps without a forepillar can be seen in the wall paintings of ancient Egyptian tombs in the Nile Valley, which date from the mid 3rd millennium BCE. These murals show an arched harp, an instrument that closely resembles the hunter's bow, without the pillar that we find in modern harps. The Chang flourished in Persia in many forms from its introduction, about 4000 BCE, until the 17th century CE.

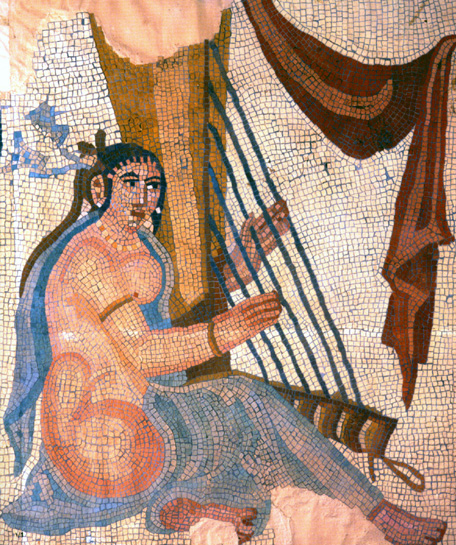
1A Sassanid era mosaic excavated at Bishapur

Around 1900 BCE, arched harps in the Iraq-Iran region were replaced by angular harps with vertical or horizontal sound boxes. The Kinnor (Hebrew: כִּנּוֹר kīnnōr) was an ancient Israelite musical instrument in the yoke lutes family, the first one to be mentioned in the Hebrew Bible. Its exact identification is unclear, but in the modern day it is generally translated as "harp" or "lyre", and associated with a type of lyre depicted in Israelite imagery, particularly the Bar Kokhba coins. It has been referred to as the "national instrument" of the Jewish people, and modern luthiers have created reproduction lyres of the kinnor based on this imagery.

By the start of the Common Era, "robust, vertical, angular harps", which had become predominant in the Hellenistic world, were cherished in the Sasanian court. In the last century of the Sasanian period, angular harps were redesigned to make them as light as possible ("light, vertical, angular harps"); while they became more elegant, they lost their structural rigidity. At the height of the Persian tradition of illustrated book production (1300–1600 CE), such light harps were still frequently depicted, although their use as musical instruments was reaching its end.

==== Greece ====
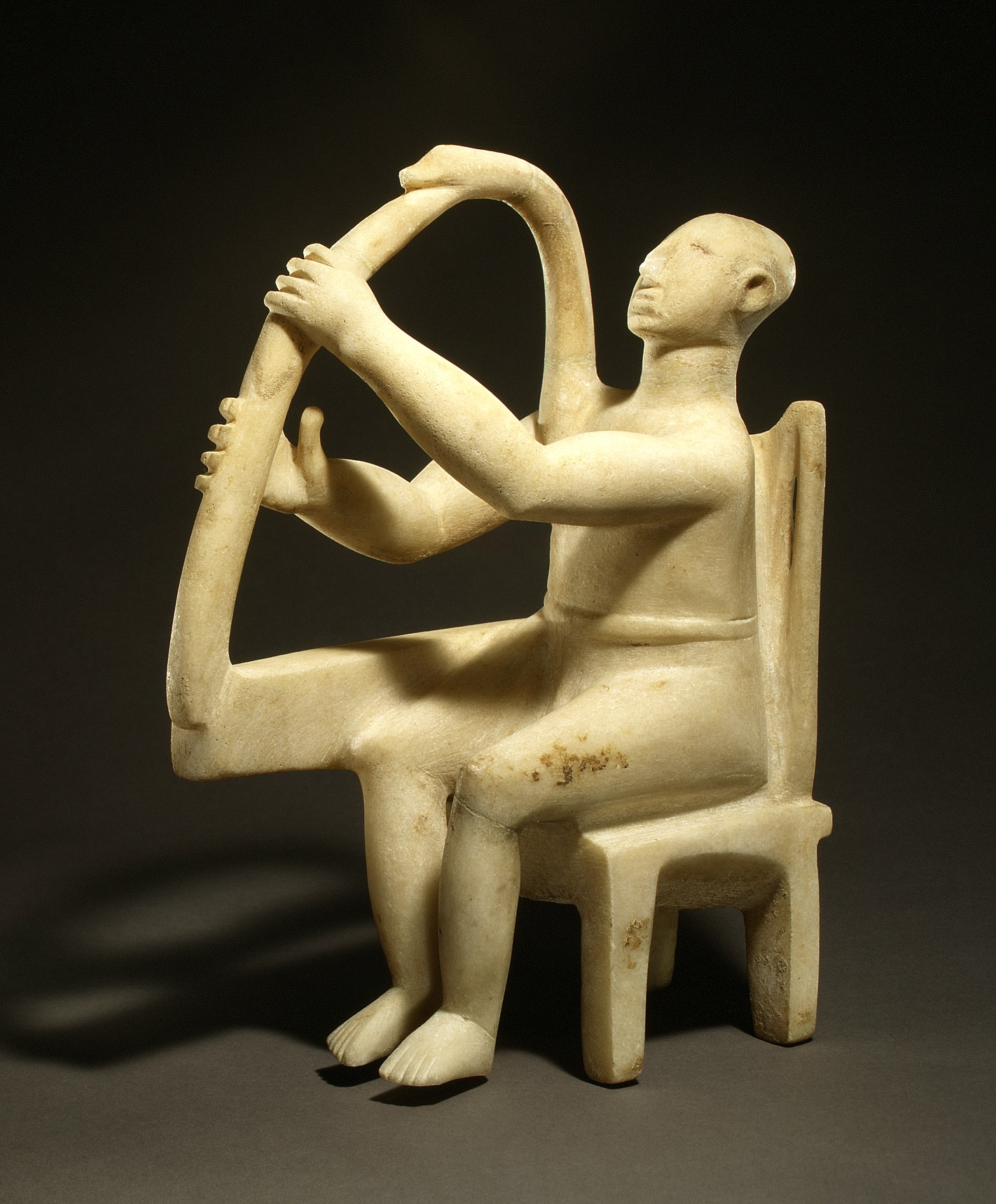
Marble seated harp player, Cycladic civilisation, Greece, 2800–2700 BCE

Marble sculptures of seated figures playing harps are known from the Cycladic civilisation dating from 2800–2700 BCE.

==== South Asia ====
Mesolithic era paintings from Bhimbetka show harp playing. An arched harp made of wooden brackets and metal strings is depicted on an Indus seal. The works of the Tamil Sangam literature describe the harp and its variants, as early as 200 BCE. Variants were described, ranging from 14 to 17 strings, and the instrument was used by wandering minstrels for accompaniment. Iconographic evidence of the yaal appears in temple statues dated as early as 600 BCE. One of the Sangam works, the Kallaadam recounts how the first yaaḻ harp was inspired by an archer's bow, when he heard the musical sound of its twang.

Another early South Asian harp was the ancient veena, not to be confused with the modern Indian veena which is a type of lute. Some Samudragupta gold coins show of the mid-4th century CE show (presumably) the king Samudragupta himself playing the instrument. The ancient veena survives today in Burma, in the form of the saung harp still played there.

==== East Asia ====
The harp was popular in ancient China and neighbouring regions. The Chinese konghou harp is documented as early as the Spring and Autumn period (770–476 BCE) A similar harp, the Gonghu was played in ancient Korea, documented as early as the Goguryeo period (37 BCE–686 CE).

=== Development ===
==== Europe ====
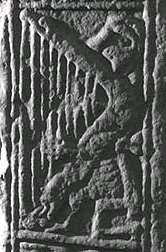
The harper on the Dupplin Cross, Scotland, c. 800 CE

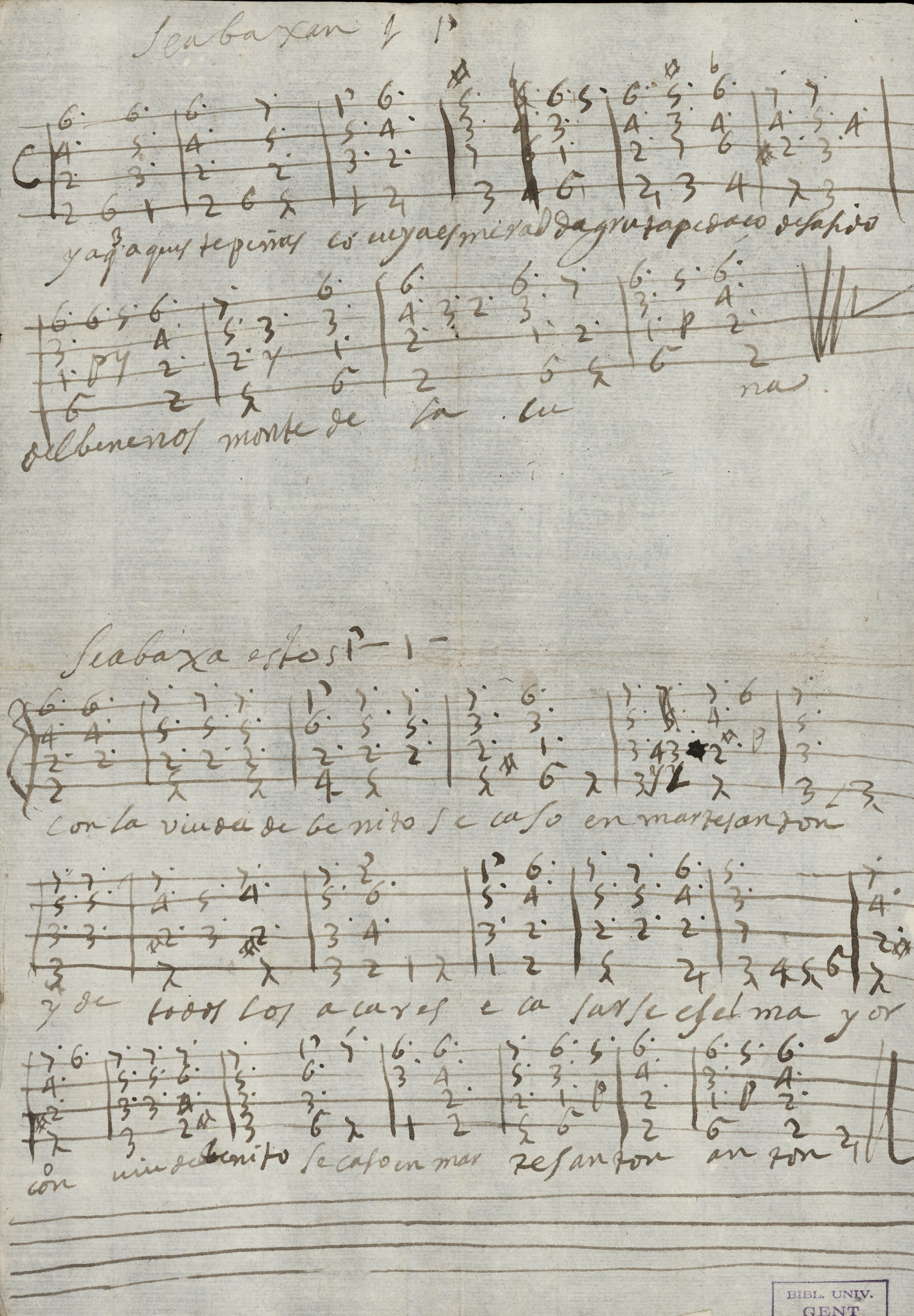
Individual sheet music for a seventeenth century baroque harp

While the angle and bow harps held popularity elsewhere, European harps favoured the "pillar", a third structural member to support the far ends of the arch and soundbox. A harp with a triangular three-part frame is depicted on 8th-century Pictish stones in Scotland and in manuscripts (e.g. the Utrecht Psalter) from early 9th-century France. The curve of the harp's neck is a result of the proportional shortening of the basic triangular form to keep the strings equidistant; if the strings were proportionately distant they would be farther apart.

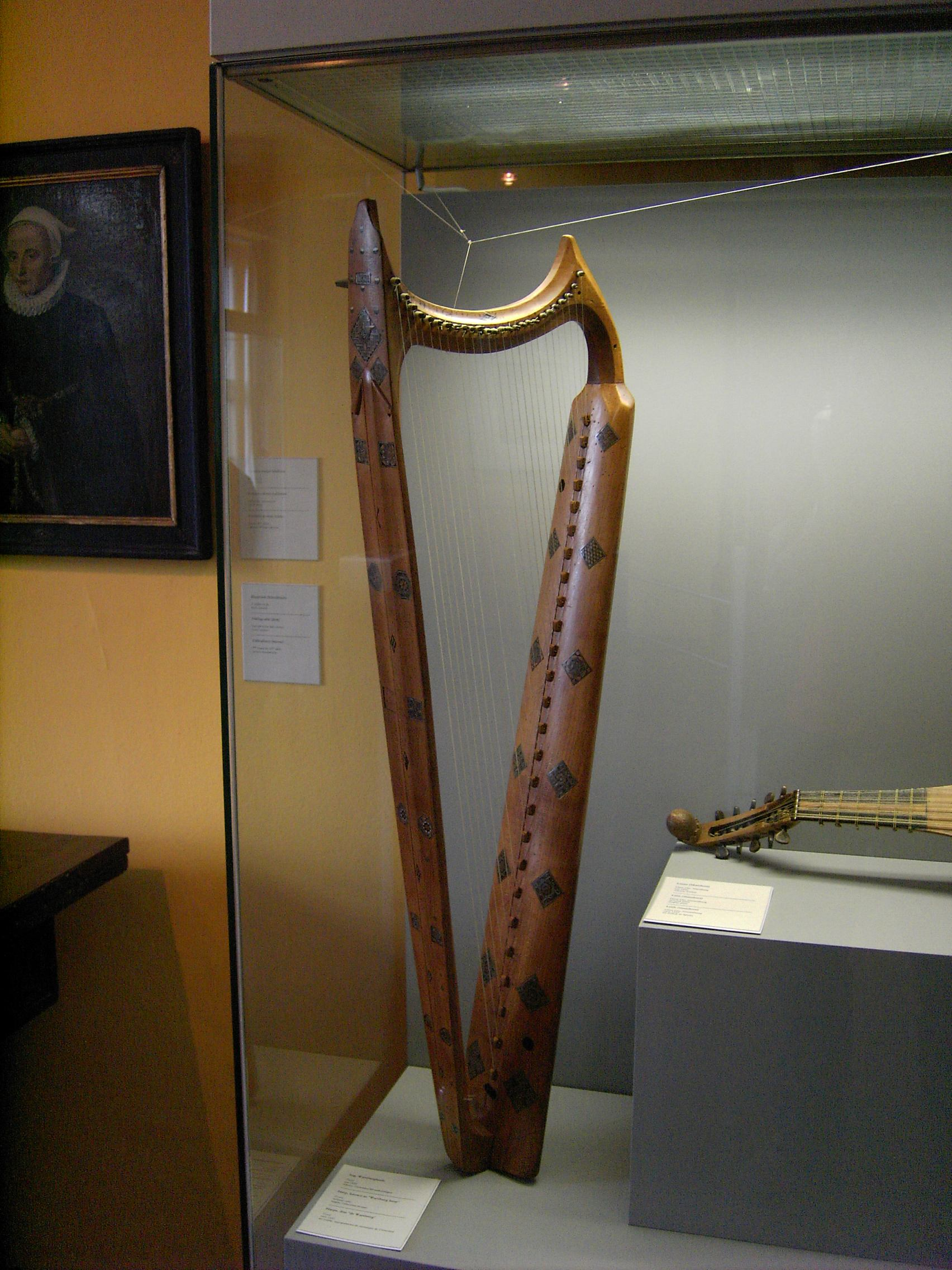
A medieval European harp (the Wartburg harp) with buzzing bray pins

As European harps evolved to play more complex music, a key consideration was some way to facilitate the quick changing of a string's pitch to be able to play more chromatic notes. By the Baroque period in Italy and Spain, more strings were added to allow for chromatic notes in more complex harps. In Germany in the second half of the 17th century, diatonic single-row harps were fitted with manually turned hooks that fretted individual strings to raise their pitch by a half step. In the 18th century, a link mechanism was developed connecting these hooks with pedals, leading to the invention of the single-action pedal harp.

The first primitive form of pedal harp was developed in the Tyrol region of Austria. Jacob Hochbrucker was the next to design an improved pedal mechanism around 1720, followed in succession by Krumpholtz, Naderman, and the Erard company, who came up with the double mechanism, in which a second row of hooks was installed along the neck, capable of raising the pitch of a string by either one or two half steps. While one course of European harps led to greater complexity, resulting largely in the modern pedal harp, other harping traditions maintained simpler diatonic instruments which survived and evolved into modern traditions.

==== Americas ====
In the Americas, harps are widely but sparsely distributed, except in certain regions where the harp traditions are very strong. Such areas include Mexico, the Andean region, Venezuela, and Paraguay. They are derived from the Baroque harps that were brought from Spain during the colonial period. Detailed features vary from place to place.

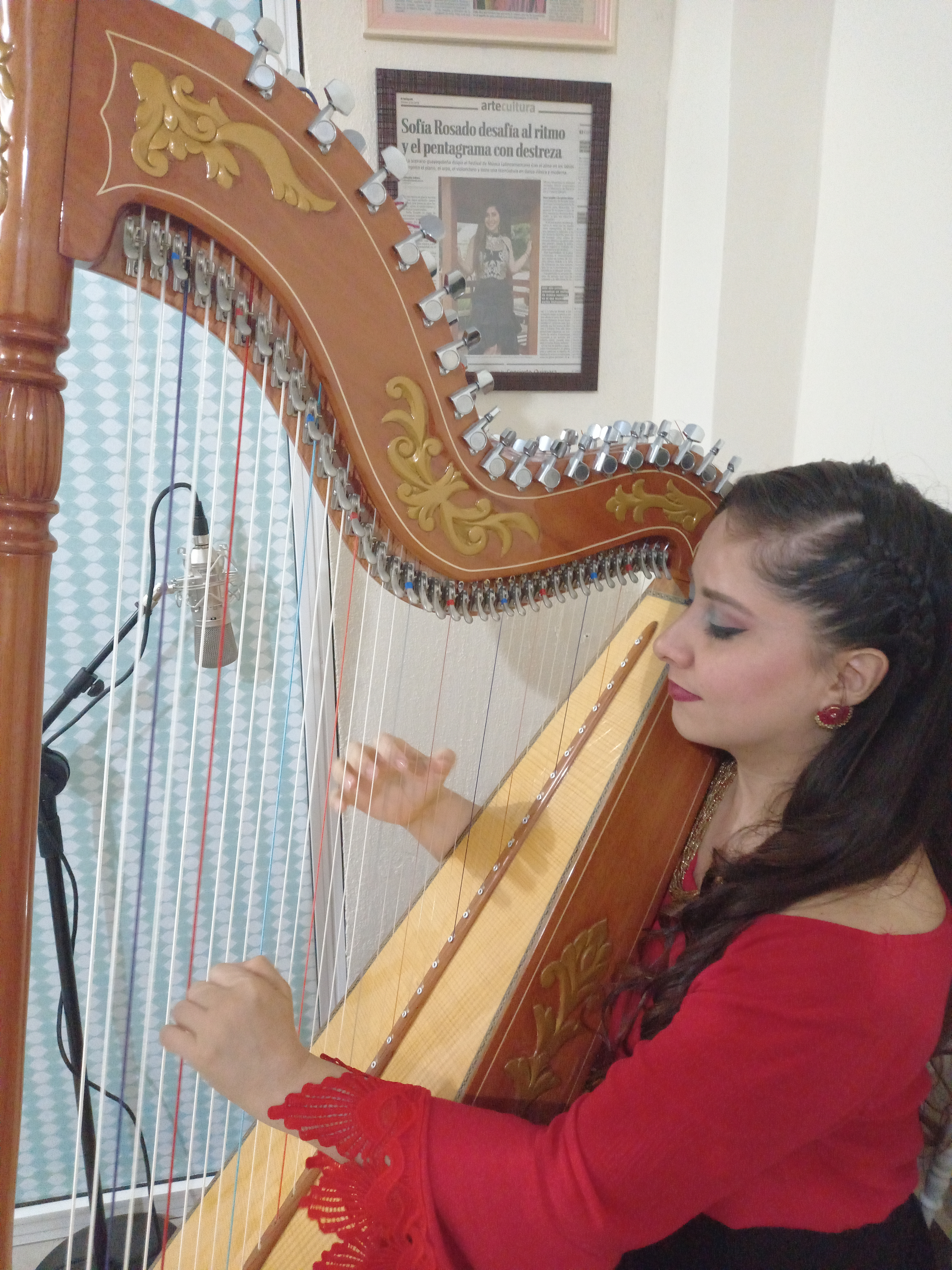
Paraguayan harp

The Paraguayan harp is that country's national instrument, and has gained a worldwide reputation, with international influences alongside folk traditions. They have around 36 strings, are played with fingernails, and with a narrowing spacing and lower tension than modern Western harps, and have a wide and deep soundbox that tapers to the top.

The harp is also found in Argentina, though in Uruguay it was largely displaced in religious music by the organ by the end of the 18th century. The harp is historically found in Brazil, but mostly in the south of the country.

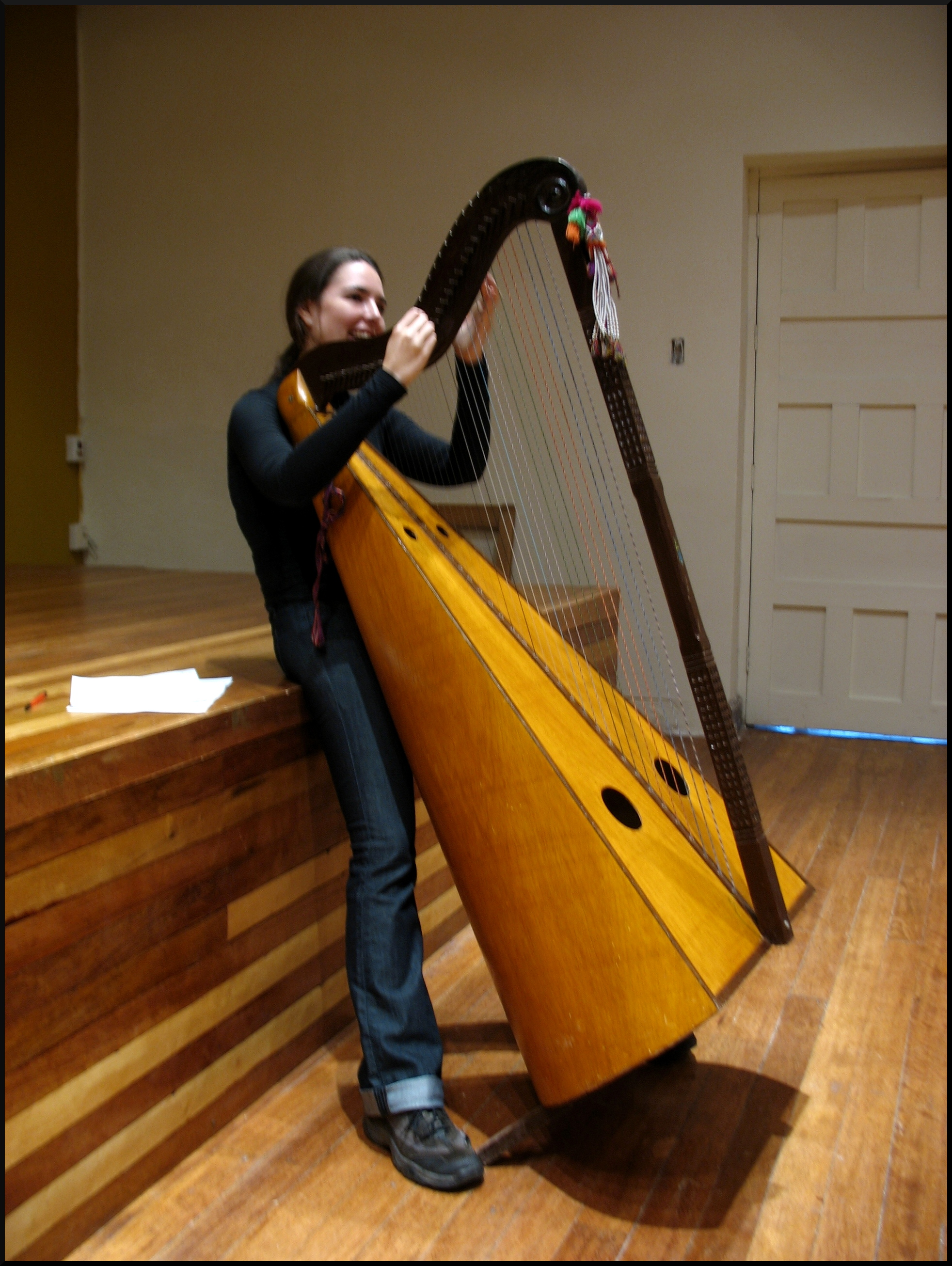
Andean harp

The Andean harp (Spanish/Quechua: arpa), also known as the Peruvian harp, or indigenous harp, is widespread among peoples living in the highlands of the Andes: Quechua and Aymara, mainly in Peru, and also in Bolivia and Ecuador. It is relatively large, with a significantly increased volume of the resonator box, which gives basses a special richness. It usually accompanies love dances and songs, such as huayno. One of the most famous performers on the Andean harp was Juan Cayambe (Pimampiro Canton, Imbabura Province, Ecuador)

The arpa jarocha is typically played while standing. In southern Mexico (Chiapas), there is a very different indigenous style of harp music.

The harp arrived in Venezuela with Spanish colonists. There are two distinct traditions: the arpa llanera ('harp of the Llanos’, or plains) and the arpa central ('of the central area'). By the 2020s, three types of harps are typically found:

- the traditional llanera harp, made of Cedar wood and has 32 strings, originally of the gut, but in modern times are of nylon. It is used to accompany both dancers and singers playing joropo music, a traditional form of Venezuelan music, also known as llanera music.
- the arpa central (also known as arpa mirandina 'of Miranda State', and arpa tuyera 'of the Tuy Valleys') is strung with wire in the higher register.
- the Venezuelan electric harp

==== Africa ====
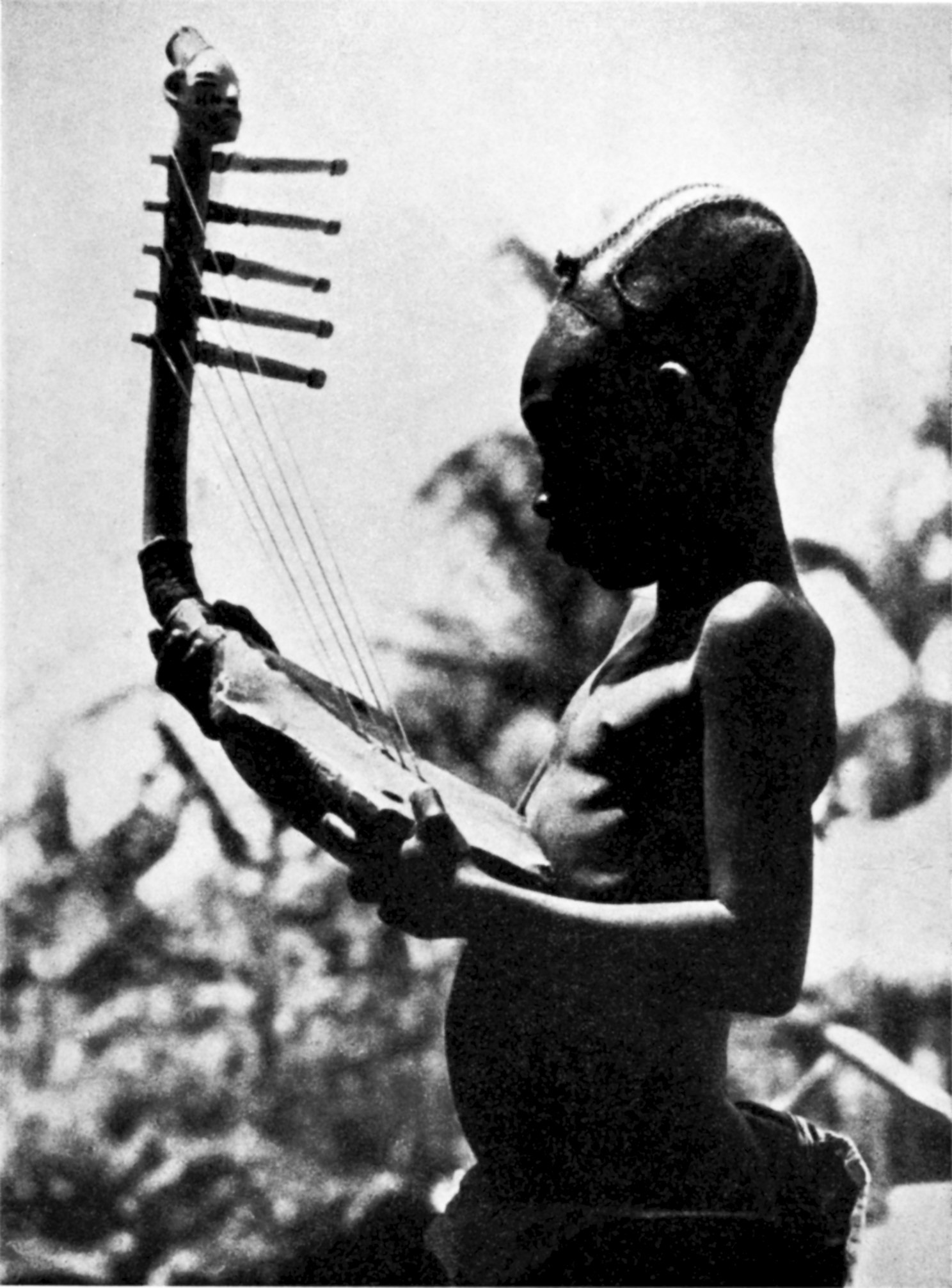
A Mangbetu man playing a bow harp

A number of types of harp are found in Africa, predominantly not of the three-sided frame-harp type found in Europe. A number of these, referred to generically as African harps, are bow or angle harps, which lack forepillars joining the neck to the body.

A number of harp-like instruments in Africa are not easily classified with European categories. Instruments like the West African kora and Mauritanian ardin are sometimes labelled as "spike harp", "bridge harp", or harp lute since their construction includes a bridge which holds the strings laterally, versus vertically entering the soundboard.

==== Armenia ====
In Armenia, stringed instruments such as the lyre have been used since ancient times; the lyre was documented in artwork on a silver goblet from Karashamb, Armenia in the 22nd-21st centuries B.C. The horizontal harp potentially dates back between 700 BC (when it appeared in Assyrian artwork) and the 5th-4th centuries BC. (the date for examples dug up in the Altai Mountains, and then in Xinjiang in northwestern China). The theory is that the instrument spread between the two locations (which would include Armenia), helped by such tribes as the Scythians.

Common usages included weddings and funerals. The "horn beaker with a feast scene", found inside a vessel in Nor Aresh and now preserved in the Erebuni Fortress, depicts a lyre. Information about early medieval Armenian musical instruments has been found in Armenian translations of the Bible. In the past, the stringed instruments such as lyres and harps were played in the royal residences, in the royal recreation rooms. Sometimes not only the royal musicians, but the kings themselves were depicted in artwork playing the instrument.

===== Lyres and harps in Armenian artwork =====
Artwork in the gallery below shows a variety of Eastern and Western styles as well as some that could be from either.

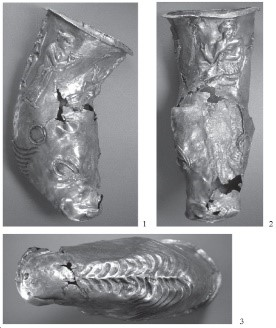
Circa 4th century B.C. Horn beaker found at Nor Aresh district near the Erebuni Fortress. Contains feast scene of a man and three women. One woman has a lyre. Erebuni Museum

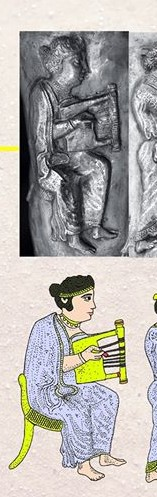
Circa 4th century B.C. Woman with lyre from horn beaker, found in excavation at the Nor Aresh district.Erebuni Museum.

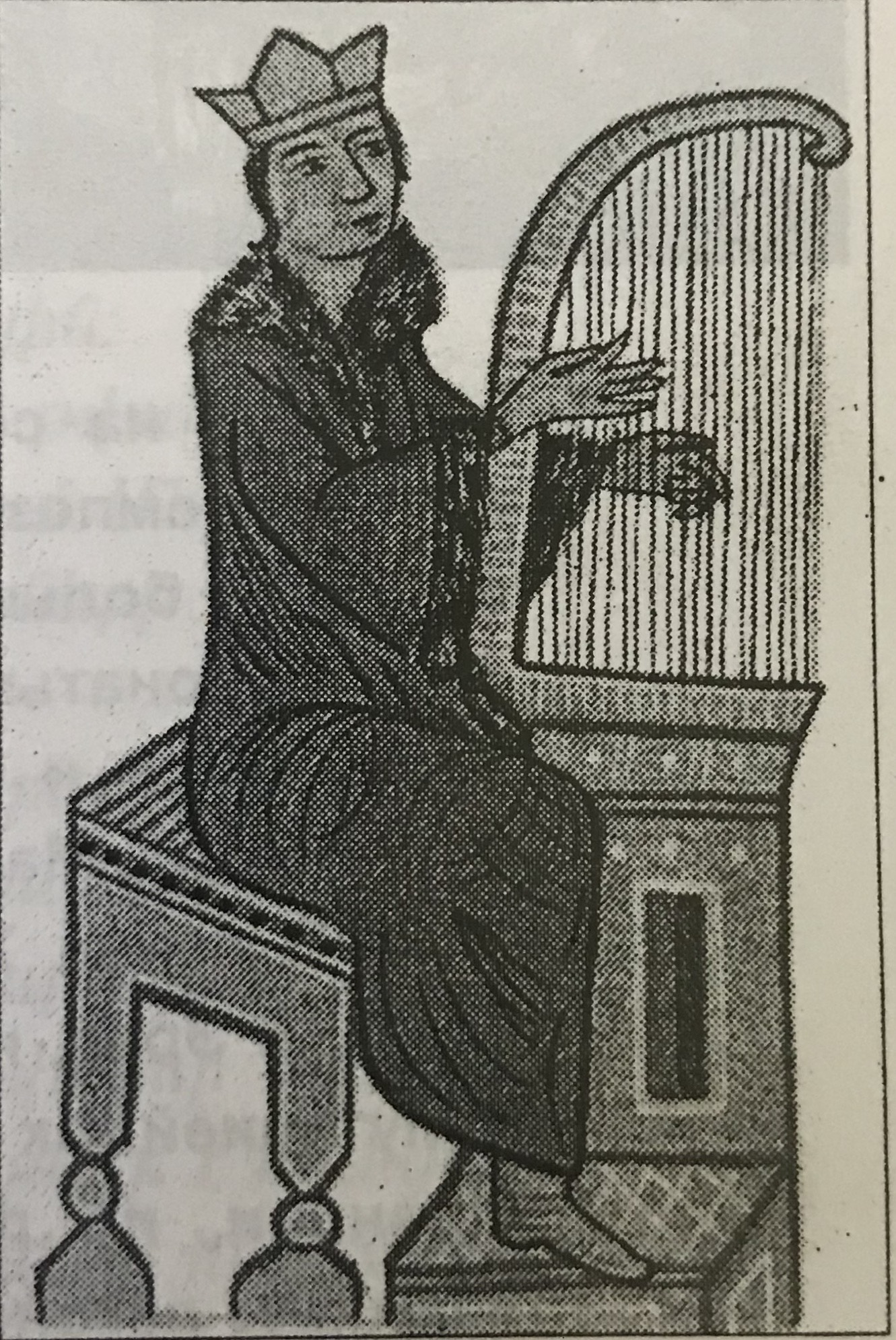
An Armenian royal harpist. Style similar to Chinese konghou and Persian chang.

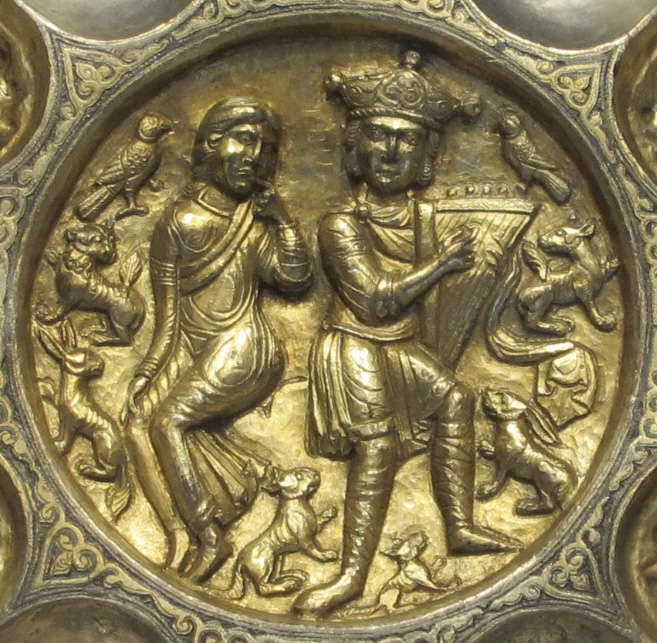
A harp or rotte on a medieval Armenian silver cup. Style resembles harps from Utrecht Psalter (Western Europe) or the rotte.

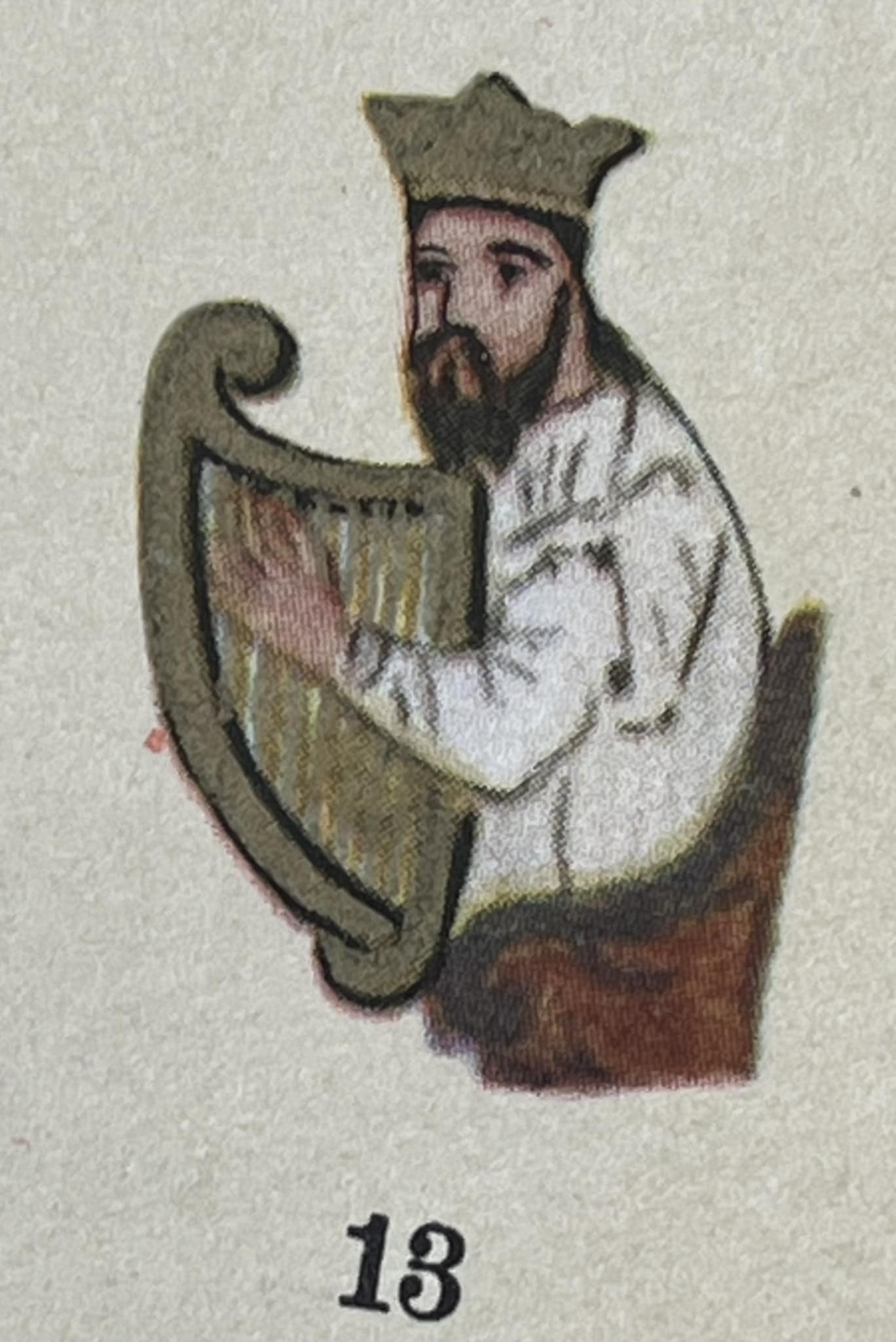
European style harp in Armenian artwork

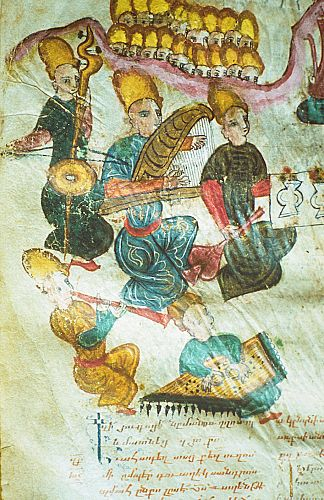
Armenian manuscript showing musicians, including harper. Resembles Persian or Central-Asian chang, as well as Chinese konghou.

==== South Asia ====
In India, the Bin-Baia harp survives about the Padhar people of Madhya Pradesh. The Kafir harp has been part of Nuristani musical tradition for many years.

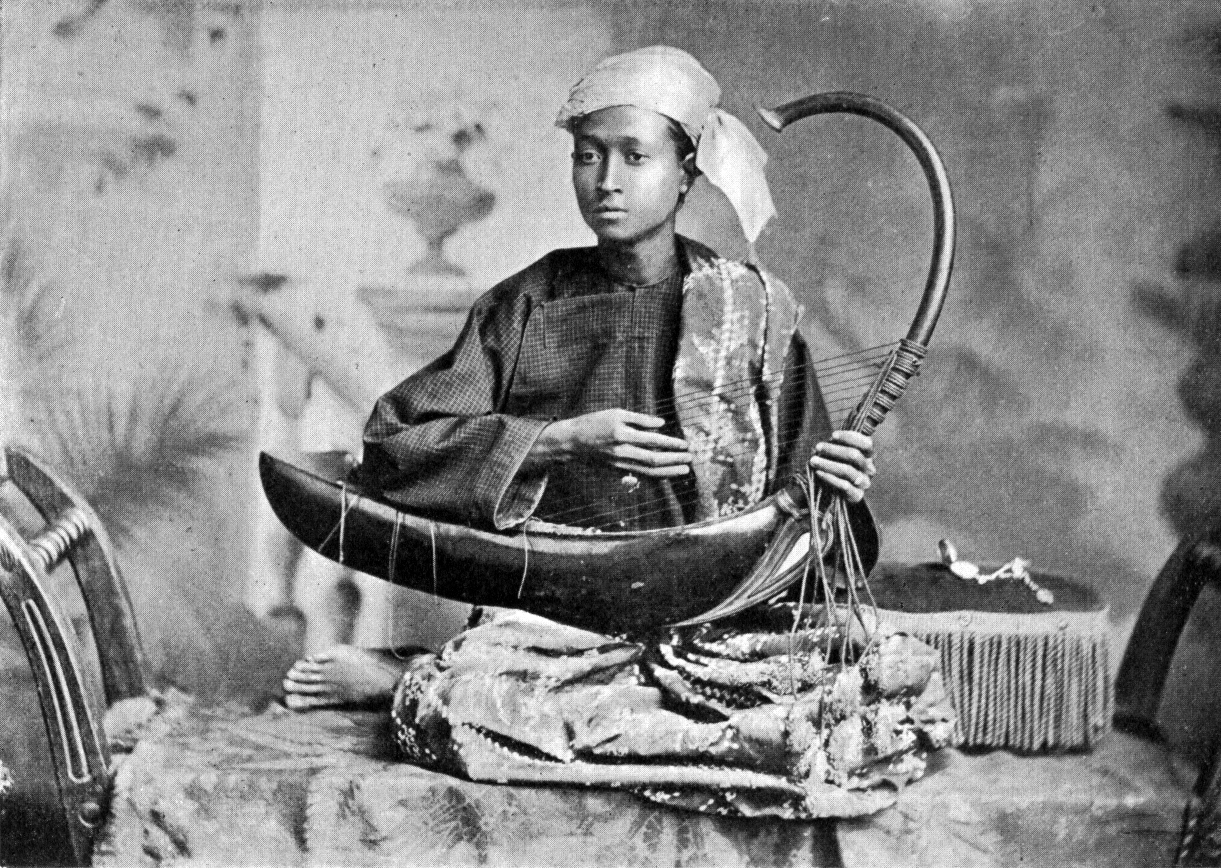
Saung musician in 1900

Around the year 1000, harps like the vajra began to replace prior harps. A few examples survived to the modern era, particularly Myanmar's saung-gauk, which is considered the national instrument in that country.

== Modern European and American harps ==
=== Concert harp ===
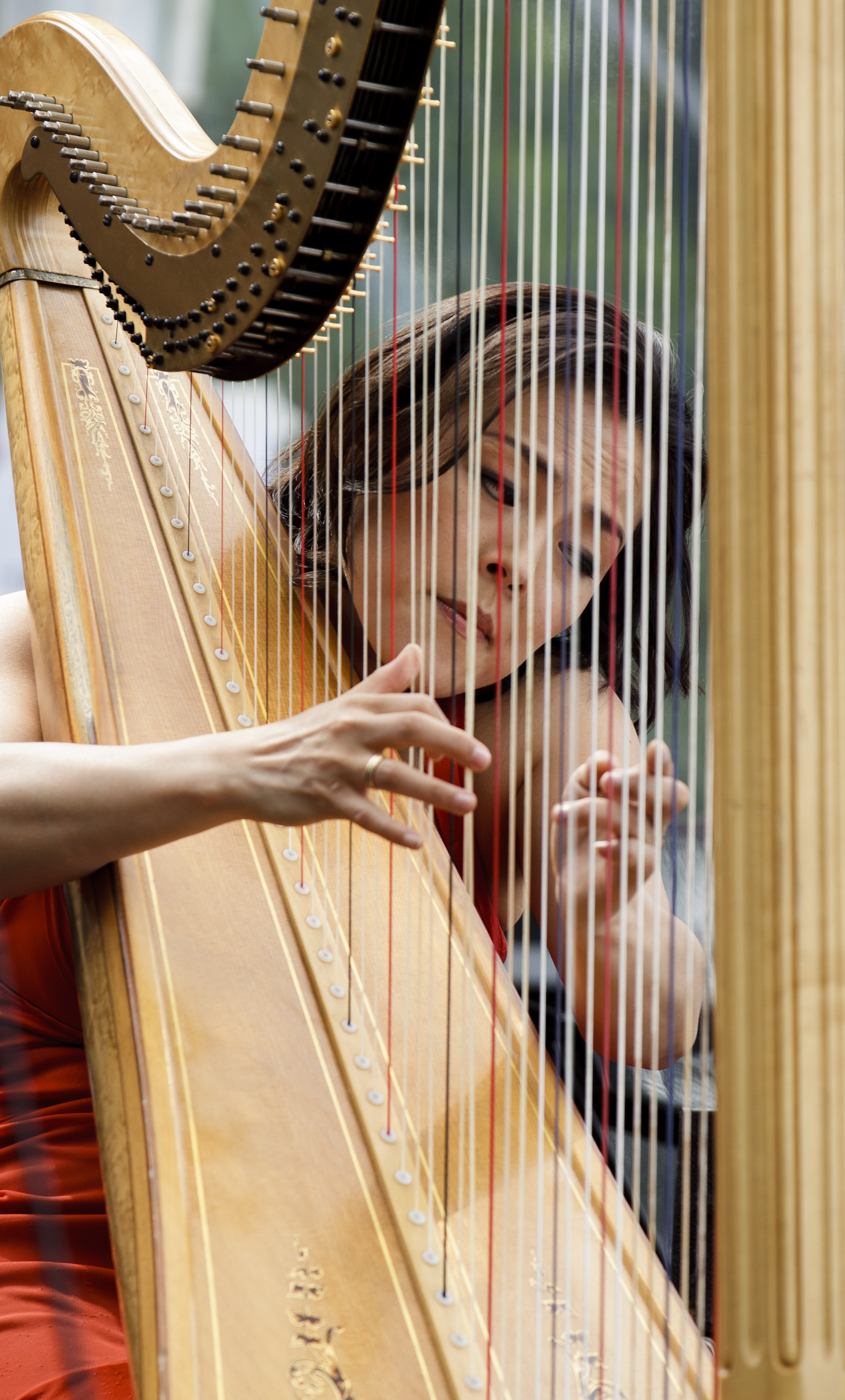
Lavinia Meijer playing the harp

The concert harp is a technologically advanced instrument, particularly distinguished by its use of pedals, foot-controlled levers which can alter the pitch of given strings, making it chromatic and thus able to play a wide body of classical repertoire. The pedal harp contains seven pedals that each affect the tuning of all strings of one pitch-class. The pedals, from left to right, are D, C, B on the left side and E, F, G, A on the right. Pedals were first introduced in 1697 by Jakob Hochbrucker of Bavaria. In 1811 these were upgraded to the "double action" pedal system patented by Sébastien Erard. Pedal harps can not play double flats or double sharps, so they should be avoided in the scoring whenever possible.

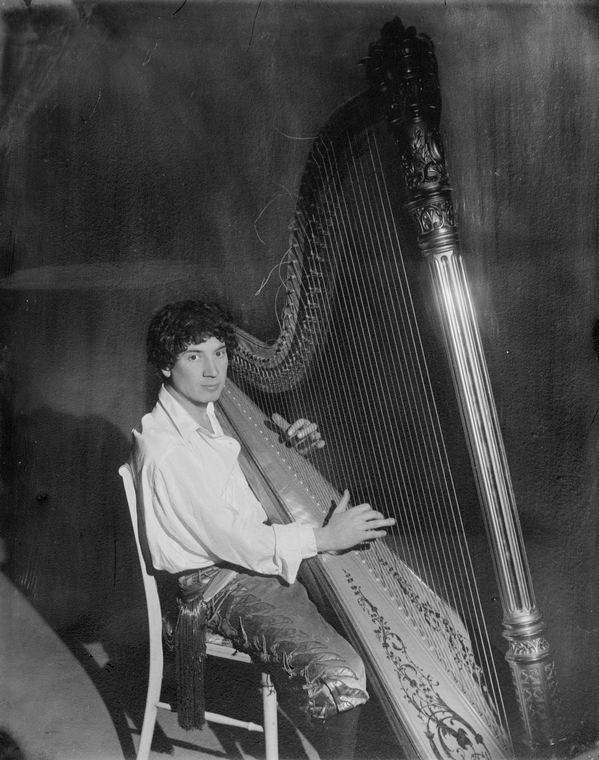
Harpo Marx would run around performing zany slapstick pantomime comedy with his brothers, then sit down to play beautiful music on the concert harp.

The addition of pedals broadened the harp's abilities, allowing its gradual entry into the classical orchestra, largely beginning in the 19th century. The harp played little or no role in early classical music (being used only a handful of times by major composers such as Mozart and Beethoven), and its use by Cesar Franck in his Symphony in D minor (1888) was described as "revolutionary" despite the harp having seen some prior use in orchestral music. In the 20th century, the pedal harp found use outside of classical music, entering musical comedy films in 1929 with Arthur "Harpo" Marx, jazz with Casper Reardon in 1934, the Beatles 1967 single "She's Leaving Home", and several works by Björk which featured harpist Zeena Parkins. In the early 1980s, Swiss harpist Andreas Vollenweider exposed the concert harp to large new audiences with his popular new age/jazz albums and concert performances.

=== Folk, lever, and Celtic instruments ===
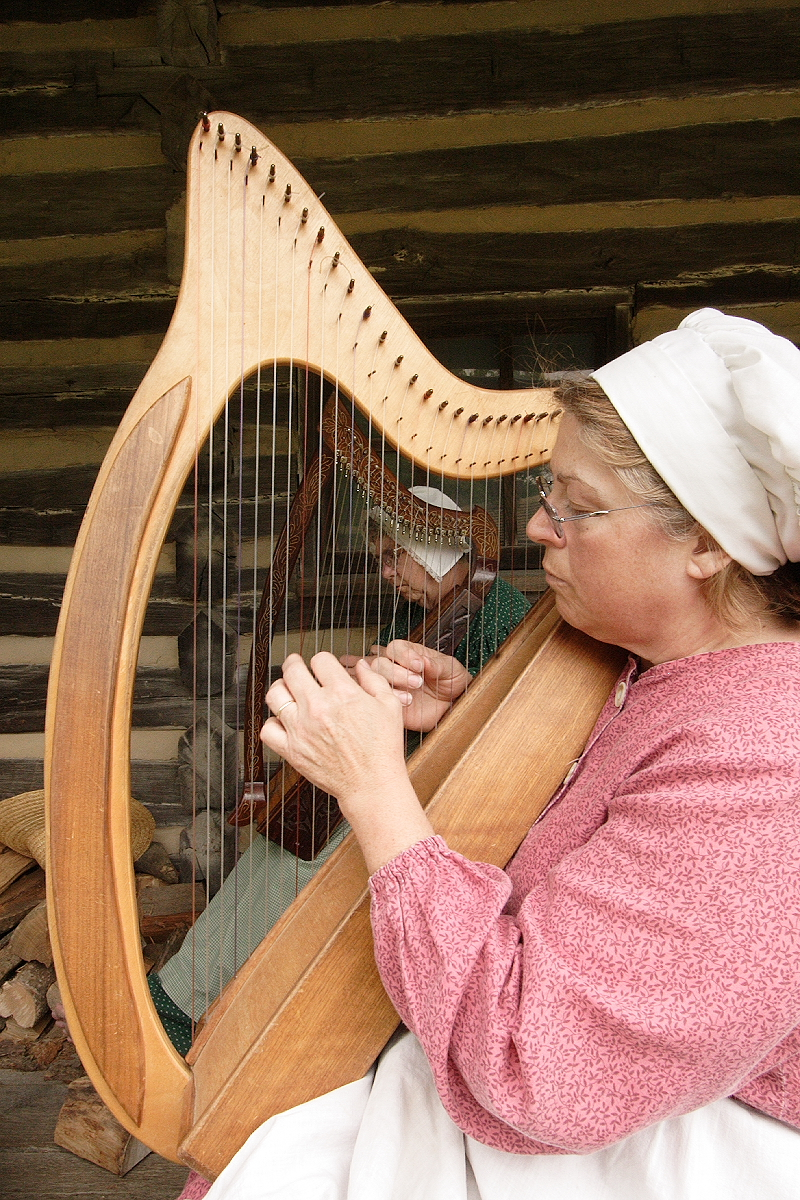
New Salem Village re-enactor playing a Celtic harp

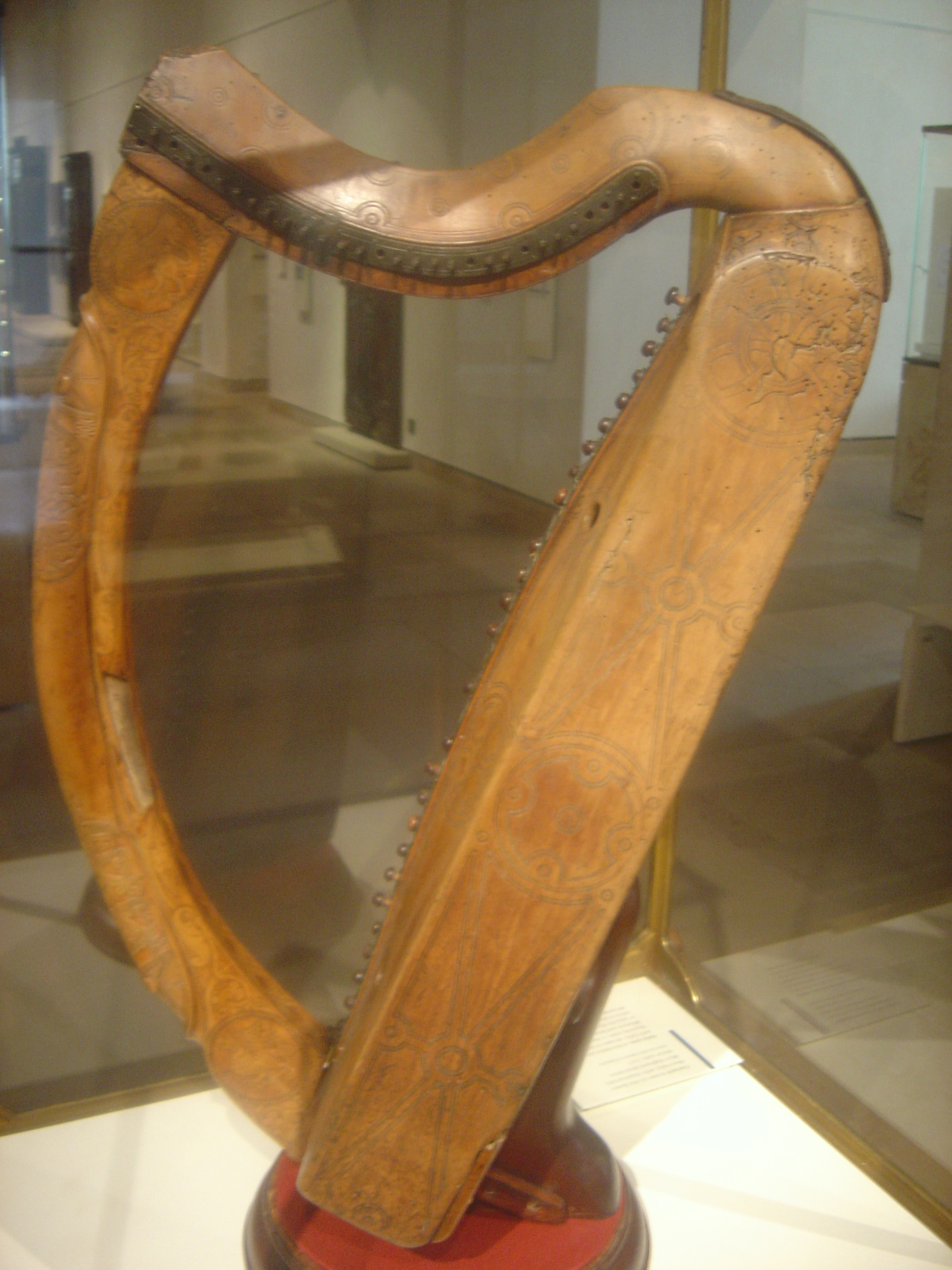
The medieval "Queen Mary Harp" (Clàrsach na Banrìgh Màiri) preserved in the National Museum of Scotland, Edinburgh. It is one of three surviving Insular Celtic medieval harps, which serve as protypes for "celtic harps".

In the modern era, there is a family of mid-size harps, generally with nylon strings, and optionally with partial or full levers but without pedals. They range from two to six octaves, and are plucked with the fingers, largely using the same techniques used for playing orchestral harps. Though these harps evoke ties to historical European harps, their specifics are modern, and they are frequently referred to broadly as "Celtic harps" due to their region of revival and popular association, or more generically as "folk harps" due to their use in non-classical music, or as "lever harps" to contrast their modifying mechanism with the larger pedal harp.

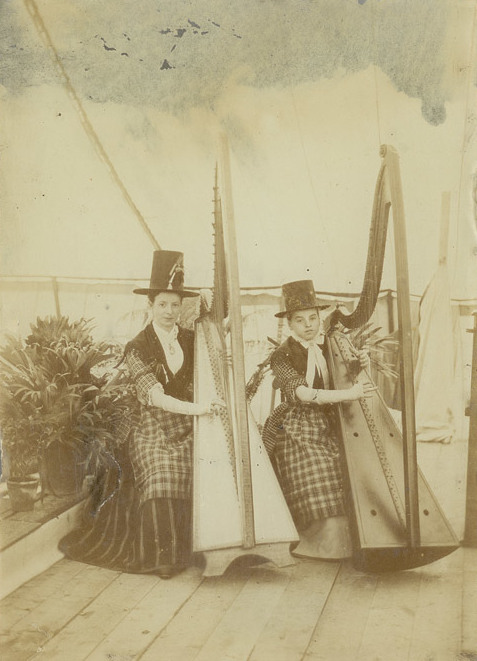
Welsh harpists at Caerwys Eisteddfod c. 1892

The modern Celtic harp began to appear in the early 19th century in Ireland, shortly after all the last generation of harpers had died out, breaking the continuity of musical training between the earlier native Gaelic harping tradition and the revival of Celtic harp playing as part of the later Celtic revival.

John Egan, a pedal harp maker in Dublin, developed a new type of harp which had gut strings and semitone mechanisms like a reduced version of a single-action pedal harp; it was small and curved like the historical cláirseach or Irish harp, but its strings were of gut and the soundbox was much lighter. In the 1890s a similar new harp was also developed in Scotland as part of the popular revival of Gaelic culture. In the mid-20th century Jord Cochevelou developed a variant of the modern Celtic harp which he referred to as the "Breton Celtic harp"; his son Alan Stivell was to become the most influential Breton harper, and a strong influence in the broader world of the Celtic harp.

=== Multi-course harps ===
A multi-course harp is a harp with more than one row of strings, as opposed to the more common "single course" harp. On a double-harp, the two rows generally run parallel to each other, one on either side of the neck, and are usually both diatonic (sometimes with levers) with identical notes.

The triple harp originated in Italy in the 16th century, and arrived in Wales in the late 17th century where it established itself in the local tradition as the Welsh harp (telyn deires, "three-row harp"). The triple harp's string set consists of two identical outer rows of standard diatonically tuned strings (same as a double-harp) with a third set of strings between them tuned to the missing chromatic notes. The strings are spaced sufficiently for the harpist to reach past the outer row and pluck an inner string when a chromatic note is needed.

=== Chromatic-strung harps ===
Some harps, rather than using pedal or lever devices, achieve chromaticity by simply adding additional strings to cover the notes outside their diatonic home scale. The Welsh triple harp is one such instrument, and two other instruments employing this technique are the cross-strung harp and the inline chromatic harp.

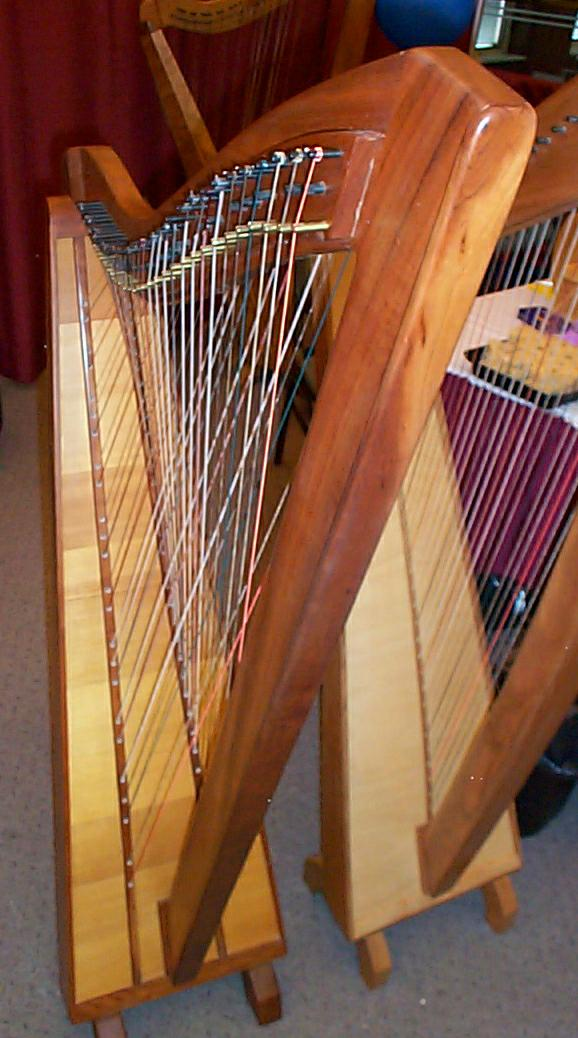
Cross-strung chromatic harp

The cross-strung harp has one row of diatonic strings, and a separate row of chromatic notes, angled in an "X" shape so that the row which can be played by the right hand at the top may be played by the left hand at the bottom, and vice versa. This variant was first attested as the arpa de dos órdenes ("two-row harp") in Spain and Portugal, in the 17th century.

The inline chromatic harp is generally a single-course harp with all 12 notes of the chromatic scale appearing in a single row. Single course inline chromatic harps have been produced at least since 1902, when Karl Weigel of Hanover patented a model of inline chromatic harp.

=== Electric harps ===
Amplified (electro-acoustic) hollow body and solid body electric lever harps are produced by many harp makers, including Lyon & Healy, Salvi, and Camac. They generally use individual piezo-electric sensors for each string, often in combination with small internal microphones to produce a mixed electrical signal. Hollow body instruments can also be played acoustically, while solid body instruments must be amplified.

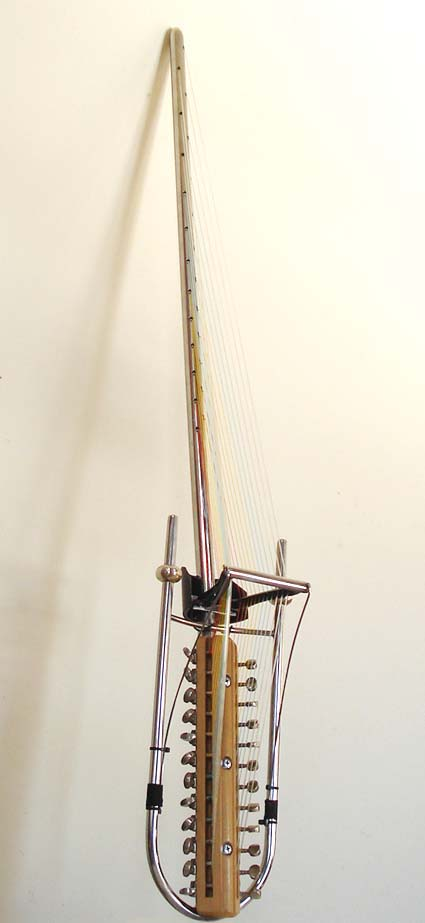
A gravikord

The late-20th century Gravikord is a modern purpose-built electric double harp made of stainless steel based on the traditional West African kora.

== Structure and mechanism ==
Basic structural elements and terminology of a modern concert harp

All harps have a neck, resonator, and strings, frame harps or triangular harps have a pillar at their long end to support the strings, while open harps, such as arch harps and bow harps, do not.

Harps are essentially triangular and made primarily of wood. Strings are made of gut or wire, often replaced in the modern day by nylon or metal. Different harps may use catgut, nylon, metal, or some combination. The top end of each string is secured on the crossbar or neck, where each will have a tuning peg or similar device to adjust the pitch. From the crossbar, the string runs down to the sounding board on the resonating body, where it is secured with a knot; on modern harps the string's hole is protected with an eyelet to limit wear on the wood. The distance between the tuning peg and the soundboard, as well as tension and weight of the string, determine the pitch of the string. The body is hollow, and when a taut string is plucked, the body resonates, projecting sound.

The longest side of the harp is called the column or pillar (though some earlier harps, such as a "bow harp", lack a pillar). On most harps the sole purpose of the pillar is to hold up the neck against the great strain of the strings. On harps which have pedals (largely the modern concert harp), the pillar is a hollow column and encloses the rods which adjust the pitches, which are levered by pressing pedals at the base of the instrument.

=== Variations and extension of chromatic range ===
Camac Harp, France, note the levers for changing pitch of the strings

Harps vary globally in many ways. In terms of size, many smaller harps can be played on the lap, whereas larger harps are quite heavy and rest on the floor. Pedal harps tend to be bigger than lever harps.

On harps of earlier design a single string produces only a single pitch. In many cases, this means such a harp can only play in one key at a time and must be retuned to play in another key. Harpers and luthiers developed varying techniques to extend the range and chromaticism of the strings (e.g., adding sharps and flats) seen in modern harps:

- the addition of extra strings to cover chromatic notes (sometimes in separate or angled rows distinct from the main row of strings),
- addition of small levers on the crossbar which when actuated raise the pitch of a string by a set interval (usually a semitone)
- use of pedals at the base of the instrument, pressed with the foot, which move additional small pegs on the crossbar. The small pegs gently contact the string near the tuning peg, changing the vibrating length, but not the tension, and hence the pitch of the string.

These solutions increase the versatility of a harp at the cost of adding complexity, weight, and expense.

On lever harps a string's note is changed by flipping a lever. Each lever acts on a single string, shortening it enough to raise the pitch by a chromatic sharp.

On pedal harps depressing the pedal one step turns geared levers on the strings for all octaves of a single pitch (for example, pressing the C pedal will make every C note a C sharp). Most pedal harps also allow a second step that turns a second set of levers. The pedal harp is a standard instrument in the orchestra of the Romantic music era (ca. 1800–1910 CE) and the 20th and 21st century music era.

== Terminology and etymology ==
The modern English word harp comes from the Old English hearpe; akin to Old High German harpha. A person who plays a pedal harp is called a "harpist"; a person who plays a folk-harp is called a "harper" or sometimes a "harpist"; either may be called a "harp-player", and the distinctions are not strict.

A number of instruments that are not harps are none-the-less colloquially referred to as "harps". Chordophones like the aeolian harp (wind harp), the autoharp, the psaltery, as well as the piano and harpsichord, are not harps, but zithers, because their strings are parallel to their soundboard. Harps' strings rise approximately perpendicularly from the soundboard. Similarly, the many varieties of harp guitar and harp lute, while chordophones, belong to the lute family and are not true harps. All forms of the lyre and kithara are also not harps, but belong to the fourth family of ancient instruments under the chordophones, the lyres, closely related to the zither family.

The term "harp" has also been applied to many instruments which are not even chordophones. The vibraphone was (and is still) sometimes referred to as the "vibraharp", though it has no strings and its sound is produced by striking metal bars. In blues music, the harmonica is often casually referred to as a "blues harp" or "harp", but it is a free reed wind instrument, not a stringed instrument, and is therefore not a true harp. The Jew's harp is neither Jewish nor a harp; it is a plucked idiophone and likewise not a stringed instrument. The laser harp is not a stringed instrument at all, but is a harp-shaped electronic instrument controller that has laser beams where harps have strings.

== As a symbol ==
=== Political ===
==== Ireland ====
Coat of arms of Ireland

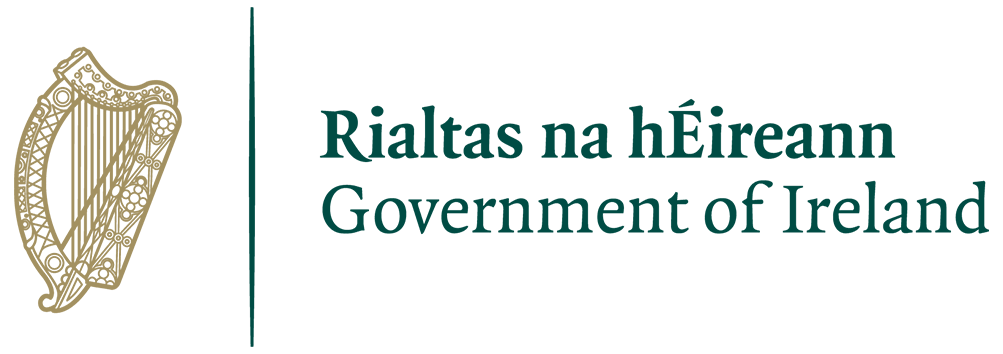
The harp is used as the official emblem of the Government of Ireland.

The harp has been used as a political symbol of Ireland for centuries. Its origin is unknown but from the evidence of the ancient oral and written literature, it has been present in one form or another since at least the 6th century or before. According to tradition, Brian Boru, High King of Ireland (died at the Battle of Clontarf, 1014) played the harp, as did many of the gentry in the country during the period of the Gaelic Lordship of Ireland (ended c. 1607 with the Flight of the Earls following the Elizabethan Wars).

In traditional Gaelic society every clan and chief of any consequence would have a resident harp player who would compose eulogies and elegies (later known as "planxties") in honour of the leader and chief men of the clan. The harp was adopted as a symbol of the Kingdom of Ireland on the coinage from 1542, and in the Royal Standard of King James VI and I in 1603 and continued to feature on all English and United Kingdom Royal Standards ever since, though the styles of the harps depicted differed in some respects. It was also used on the Commonwealth Jack of Oliver Cromwell issued in 1649 and on the Protectorate Jack issued in 1658 as well as on the Lord Protector's Standard issued on the succession of Richard Cromwell in 1658. The harp is also traditionally used on the flag of Leinster.

Since 1922, the government of Ireland has used a similar left-facing harp, based on the Trinity College Harp in the Library of Trinity College Dublin as its state symbol. This design first appeared on the Great Seal of the Irish Free State, which in turn was replaced by the coat of arms, the Irish Presidential Standard and the Presidential Seal in the 1937 Constitution of Ireland. The harp emblem is used on official state seals and documents including the Irish passport and has appeared on Irish coinage from the Middle Ages to the current Irish imprints of euro coins.

==== Elsewhere ====
A red eagle-headed harp in the coat of arms of Kangasala

The South Asian Tamil harp yaal is the symbol of City of Jaffna, Sri Lanka, whose legendary root originates from a harp player.

The arms of the Finnish city of Kangasala features a red, eagle-headed harp.

=== Religious ===
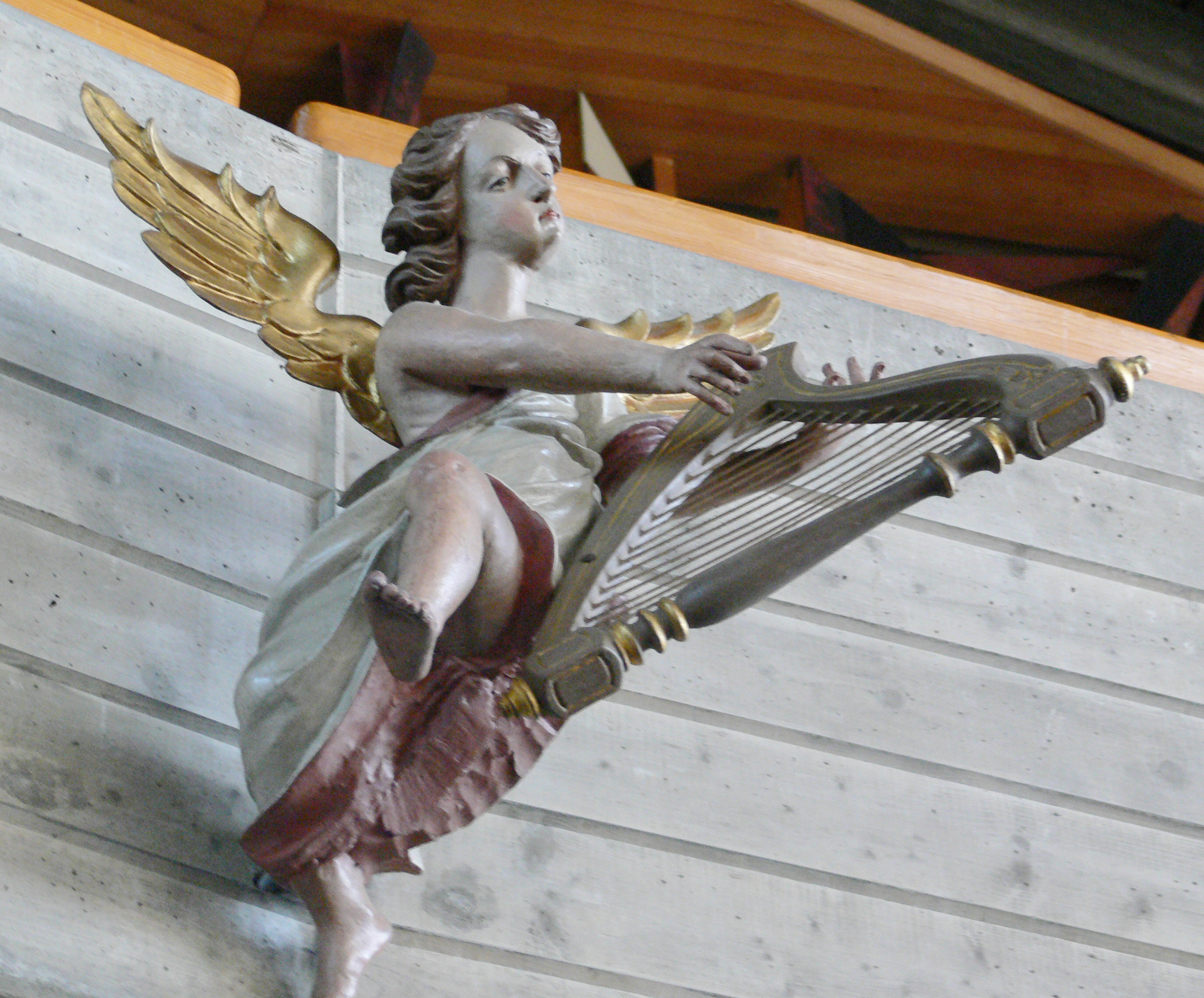
St. Maria (Weingarten/Württemberg)

In the context of Christianity, heaven is sometimes symbolically depicted as populated by angels playing harps, giving the instrument associations of the sacred and heavenly. In the Bible, Genesis 4:21 says that Jubal, the first musician and son of Lamech, was 'the father of all who play' the harp and flute.

Many depictions of King David in Jewish art have him holding or playing a harp, such as a sculpture outside King David's tomb in Jerusalem.

=== Corporate ===
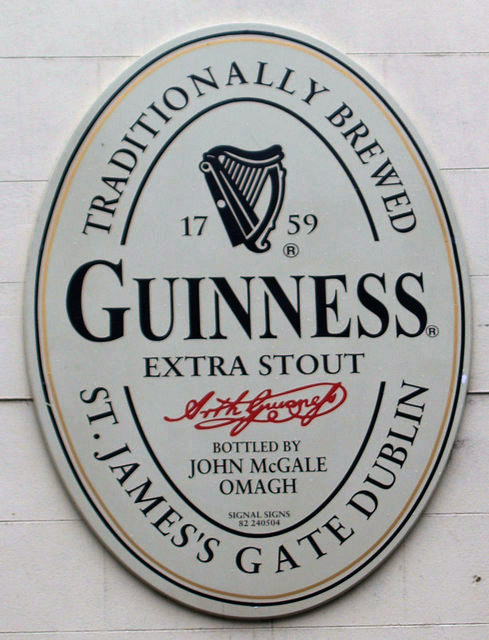
Pub advertising sign for the Irish beer brand Guinness

The harp is also used extensively as a corporate logo, predominantly by companies that have, or wish to suggest, a connection with Ireland. The Irish brewer Guinness has used a right-facing harp (in contrast to the Irish State emblem's left-facing version) as its emblem since 1759, the Harp Lager brand has done so since 1960. The Irish Independent newspaper has used a harp in its masthead since 1961. The Irish airline Ryanair, founded in 1985, also features a stylised harp in its logo.

Other organisations in Ireland use the harp in their corporate identity, but not always prominently; these include the National University of Ireland and the associated University College Dublin, and the Gaelic Athletic Association. In Northern Ireland, the Police Service of Northern Ireland and the Queen's University of Belfast use the harp as part of their identity.

=== Sporting ===
In sport, the harp is used in the emblems of the League of Ireland football team Finn Harps F.C., Donegal's senior soccer club. Outside of Ireland, it appears in the badge of the Scottish Premiership team Hibernian F.C. – a team originally founded by Irish emigrants.

Not all sporting uses of the harp are references to Ireland, however: the Iraqi football club Al-Shorta has used a harp as its emblem since the early 1990s, after they gained the nickname Al-Qithara (Assyrian Neo-Aramaic: "the harp") when their style of play was likened to fine harp-playing by a television presenter.

== See also ==
- List of compositions for harp
- List of harpists
- Berners Street harp makers
- Category:Harpists

=== Types of harp ===
- Celtic harp, or Clàrsach, a modern replica of Medieval north European harps
- Claviharp, a 19th century instrument that combined a harp with a keyboard
- Epigonion, a 40 stringed instrument in ancient Greece thought to have been a harp
- Kantele, a traditional Finnish and Karelian zither-like instrument
- Konghou, name shared by an ancient Chinese harp and a modern re-adaption
- Kora, a west-African folk-instrument, intermediate between a harp and a lute
- Lyre, kithara, zither-like instruments used in Greek classical antiquity and later
- Pedal harp, the modern concert harp
- Psaltery, a small, flat, lap instrument in the zither family
- Triple harp, a chromatic multi-course harp traditional in Wales

== Sources ==
- Bova, Lucia (2008). L'arpa moderna. La scrittura, la notazione, lo strumento e il repertorio dal '500 alla contemporaneità. SugarMusic. ISBN 978-88-900691-4-7.
- Gaisford, Thomas. Etymologicum Magnum. ISBN 960-400-139-6.
- Inglefield, Ruth K.; Neill, Lou Anne (1985). Writing for the Pedal Harp: A Standardized Manual for Composers and Harpists. University of California Press. ISBN 978-0-520-04832-4.
- Lawrence, Lucile; Salzedo, Carlos (1929). Method for the Harp: Fundamental exercises with illustrations and technical explanations. New York: G. Schirmer. "as an Introduction and Complement to Carlos Salzedos̀ Modern Study of the Harp by Lucile Lawrence and Carlos Salzedo"
- Rensch, Roslyn (June 2007) [1989]. Harps and Harpists. Indiana University Press. ISBN 978-0-253-34903-3.
- Ross, Alasdair (Winter 1998). "Harps of their owne sorte? A reassessment of Pictish chordophone depictions". Cambrian Medieval Celtic Studies. Vol. 36.
- Shepherd, John; Horn, David; Laing, Dave; Oliver, Paul; Wicke, Peter (8 May 2003). Continuum Encyclopedia of Popular Music of the World. Vol. Part 1 – Performance and Production. A&C Black. pp. 427–437. ISBN 978-1-84714-472-0.
