= Inline chromatic harp =

An inline chromatic harp is a harp where the strings for all 12 chromatic notes of the octave are placed in one row (the same way strings are placed on a standard concert harp), as opposed to their being placed in two or three (parallel or crossing) courses.

At least one example of a harp with two parallel inline chromatic courses has also been produced.

Single course inline chromatic harps have been produced for at least the past 110 years: in 1902 Karel Weigel of Hanover (Germany) patented a model of inline chromatic harp. He built at least one 54 string (4 octaves and a fourth) model which is now housed in the Deutsches Museum (Munich).

A disadvantage of inline chromatic harps is that glissandi can only be performed chromatically.
