= Psaltery =

Stringed instrument

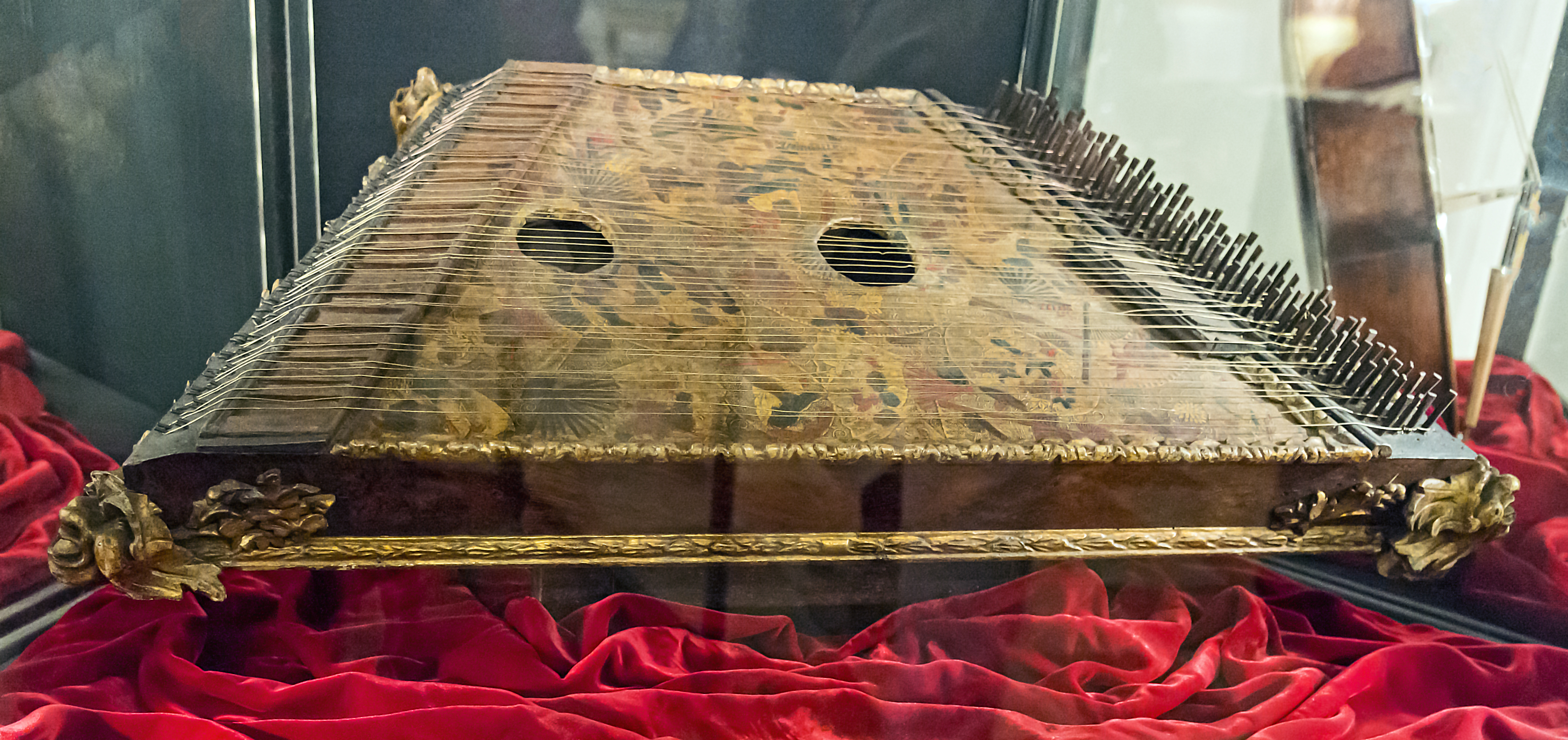
- Psaltery 1700 – Venetian school

plucked string
- Classification: Chordophone
- Hornbostel–Sachs classification: 314.122 (Box zither. Chordophone with one or more strings stretched between fixed points, a board for a string bearer, parallel to the plane of the strings, with a resonator box)

Related instruments
- Baltic psaltery; Dan tranh; Dulcimer; Gayageum; Gusli; Guzheng; Jetigen; Kacapi; Kanklės; Kannel; Kantele; Kokle; Koto; Qanun; Rotte; Se; Zither; Yatga; Jadagan

See Rotte (psaltery) for medieval harp psaltery & Ancient Greek harps for earlier psalterion

A psaltery (Ancient Greek: ψαλτήριον), or sawtry, an archaic form, is a fretboard-less box zither (a simple chordophone) and is considered the archetype of the zither and dulcimer. Plucked keyboard instruments such as the harpsichord were also inspired by it. Its resonance box is usually trapezoidal, rectangular or in the form of a "pig's head" and often richly decorated.

== Etymology ==
Psalterion harp vs Psaltery and rote

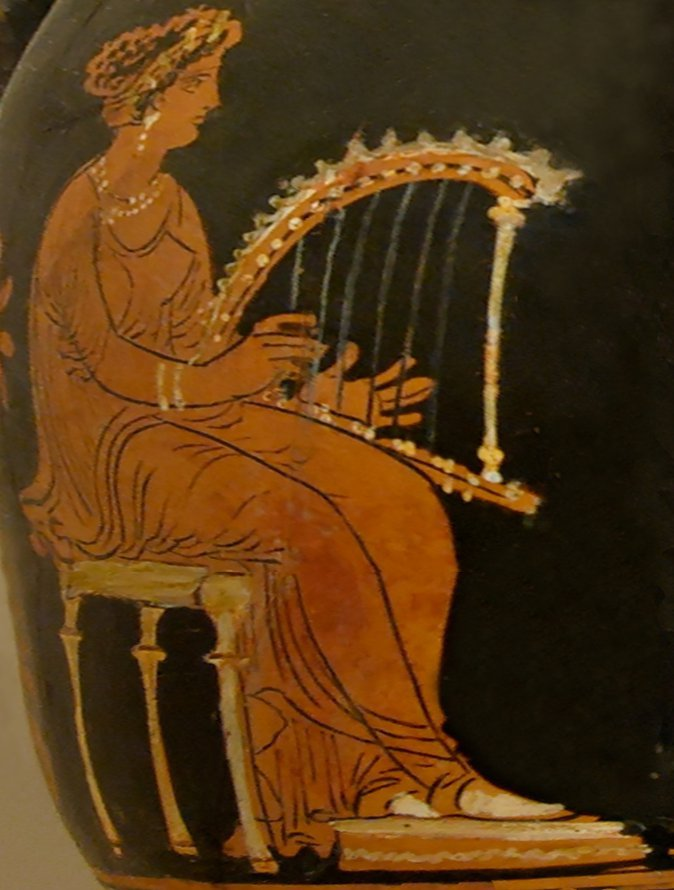
A woman playing a triangular harp, which was called by "Jewish, Christian and Greek sources" a psalterion. Ancient Greek red-figured pelike from Anzi, Apulia, circa 320–310 BC.

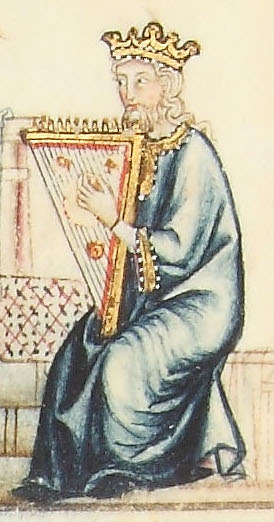
Triangular psaltery or rotte. Not a harp, as the sound-box blocks the viewer from seeing through the instrument; also it has sound holes.

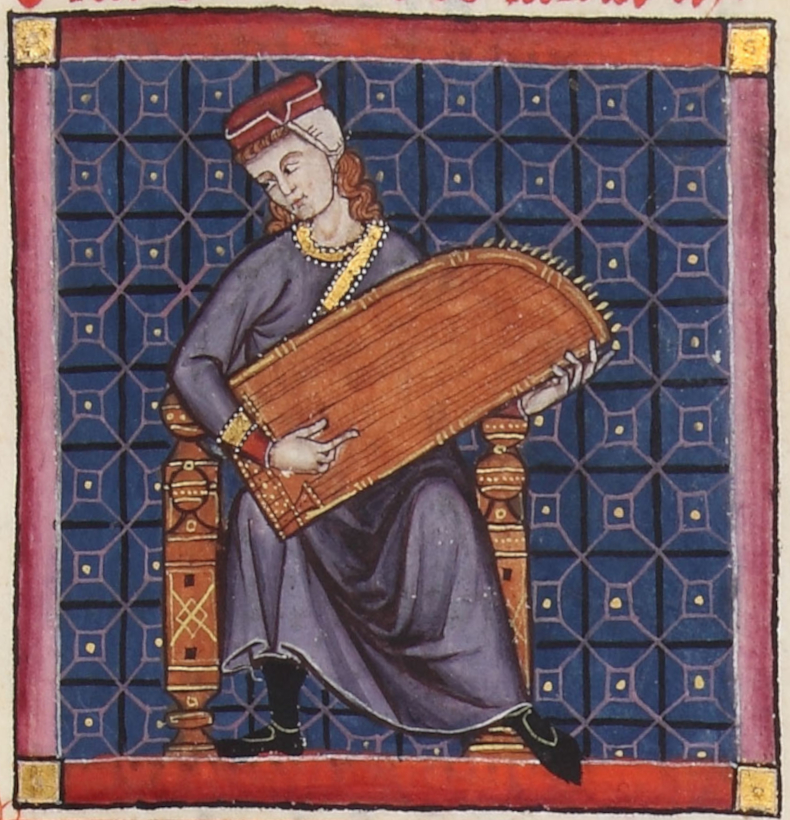
Resembling a harp, this was identified as a psaltery. Print detailed enough to show bridges on the instrument's bottom and strings running in courses.

Psalteries in a triangular shape were confused with harps at times. They used the top-horizontal side used to hold the tuning pegs. These psalteries were known as the "rote" or a variation of that name. The three sided instruments were popular in parts of the church for their symbolic three sides, reminder of the Trinity.

The psaltery of Ancient Greece (epigonion) was a harp-like stringed instrument. The word psaltery derives from the Ancient Greek ψαλτήριον (psaltḗrion), 'stringed instrument, psaltery, harp' and that from the verb ψάλλω (psállō), "to touch sharply, to pluck, pull, twitch" and in the case of the strings of musical instruments, "to play a stringed instrument with the fingers, and not with the plectrum." The psaltery was originally made from wood, and relied on natural acoustics for sound production.

In the King James Bible psaltery, and its plural, psalteries, are used to translate several words from the Hebrew Bible whose meaning is now unknown.

== Characteristics ==
While the Greek instruments were harps, psaltery came to mean instruments that were strung across a resonating wood box. The box-zither psalteries may have a Phoenician origin. The strings of the medieval instrument were usually made of metal, unlike the finger-plucked harp, strung with catgut, and played using a plectrum or "pick". The harp is strung with a single string for each tone, open to be plucked from either side of the instrument; a psaltery may have multiple strings for each tone, strung across a soundboard. The psaltery has been compared to the harpsichord and dulcimer, though some forms of the latter are not plucked, but struck with hammers.

== Medieval and Renaissance psalteries ==
From the 12th through the 15th centuries, psalteries are widely seen in manuscripts, paintings and sculpture throughout Europe. Examples found in one reference book, the Groves New Encyclopedia of Musical Instruments, show examples in paintings from the 9th century Carolingian Empire Benedictine Psalter, in 13th-century Spain (in the Cantigas de Santa Maria), in Bohemia in the 14th century, in Italy in the 14th century, and Germany in the 15th century.

Shapes included "triangular (rotte), trapezoidal, semitrapezoidal, wing shaped, or harp shaped". The psalterion decacordum was shaped like a square and had ten strings strung vertically. Stings could run in courses, as viewed in the middle-ages artwork.

== Modern psaltery ==
While psalteries had largely died out in Europe by the 19th century, the salterio remained common in Mexico well into the twentieth century and is still played in some regional styles.

The hammered dulcimer and related instruments, such as the santur, cimbalom, yangqin, and khim, appear very similar to psalteries, and it is often hard to tell which one historical images represent. They differ in that the player strikes the strings with small hammers rather than plucking them. As a result, they have much higher string tension and heavier frames.

In the 19th century, several related zithers came into use, notably the guitar zither and the autoharp. In the 20th century, the bowed psaltery came into wide use. It is set up in a triangular format so that the end portion of each string can be bowed.

== Gallery ==
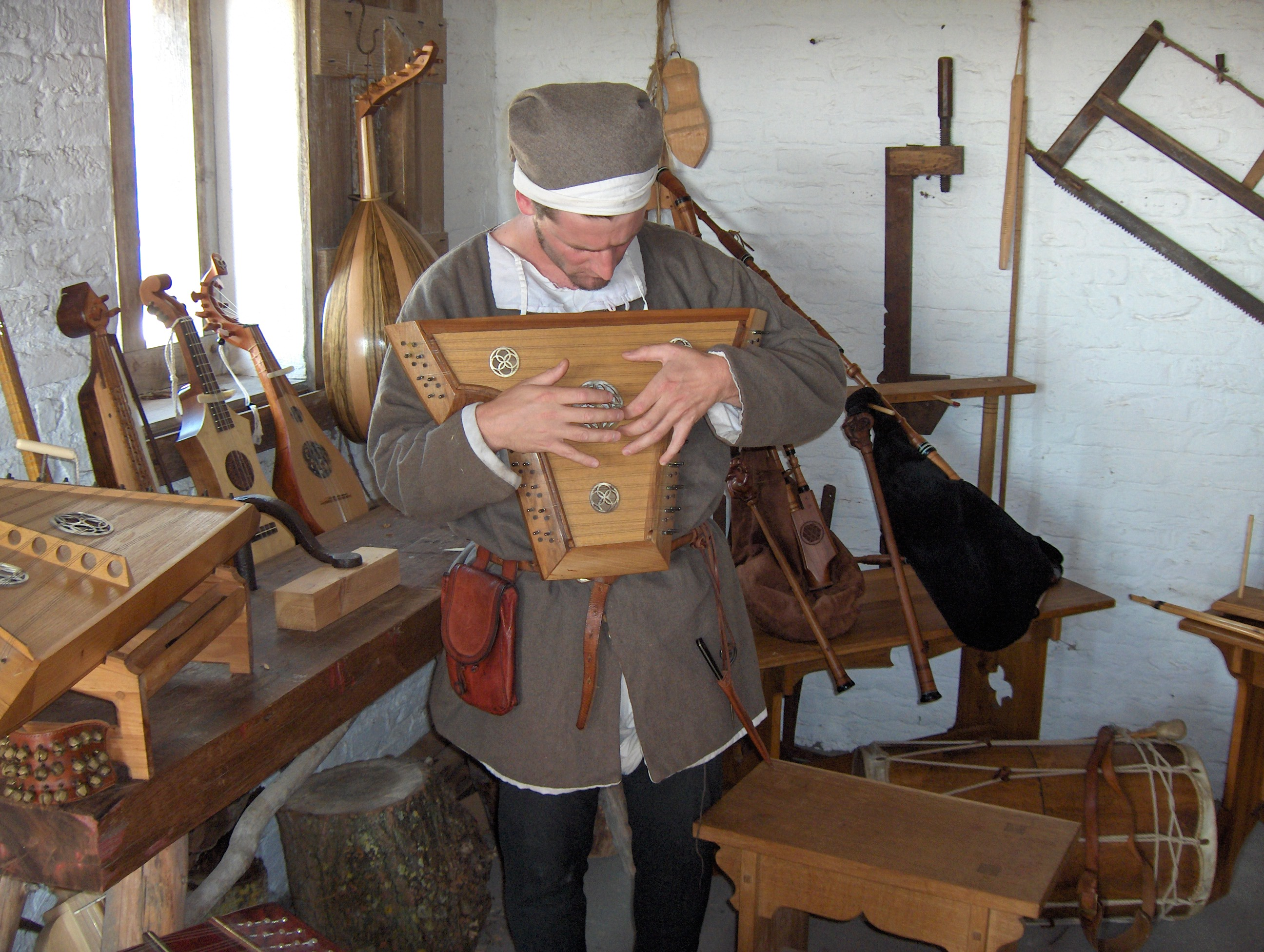
Psaltery in the shape called a "pig's head" psaltery, a very common psaltery shape in manuscripts.

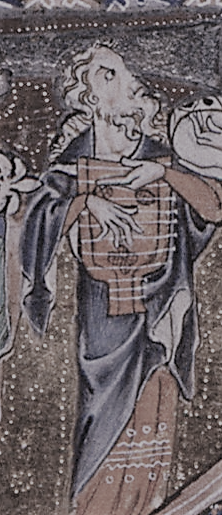
Gorleston-on-Sea, England. Psaltery player from the Gorleston Psalter, c. 1310–1326.

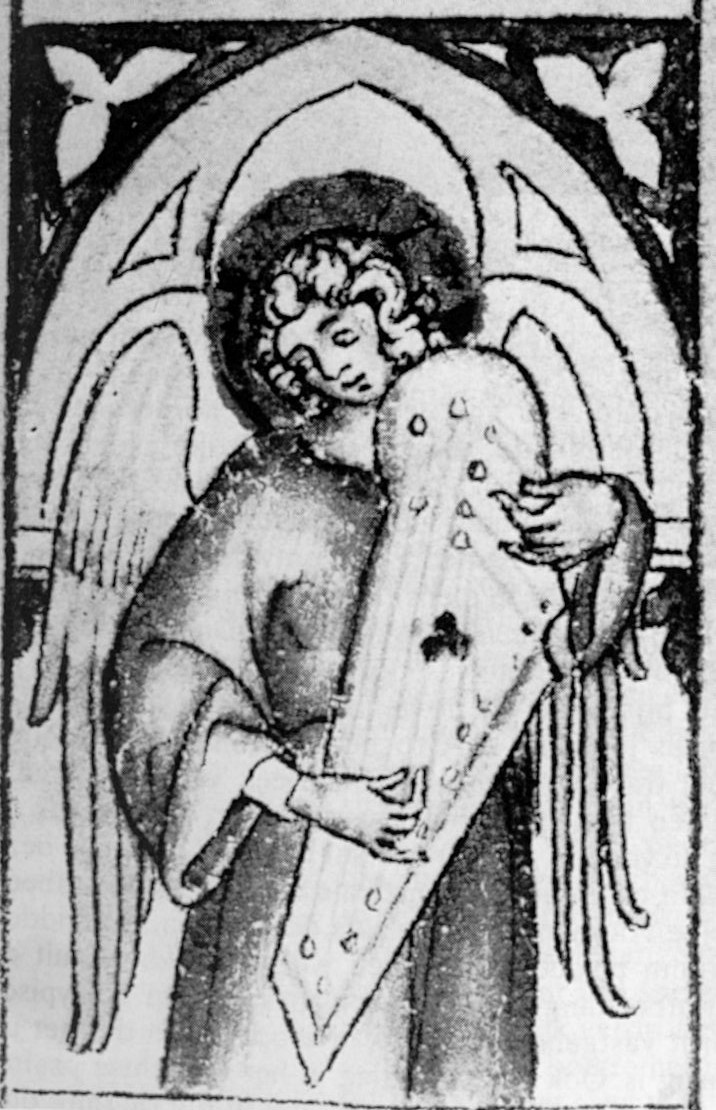
(Kingdom of Bohemia, 14th century). Picture of an unusual type of psaltery, found in Central Europe. Labeled "Bohemian wing" psaltery in Grove Dictionary of Musical Instruments.

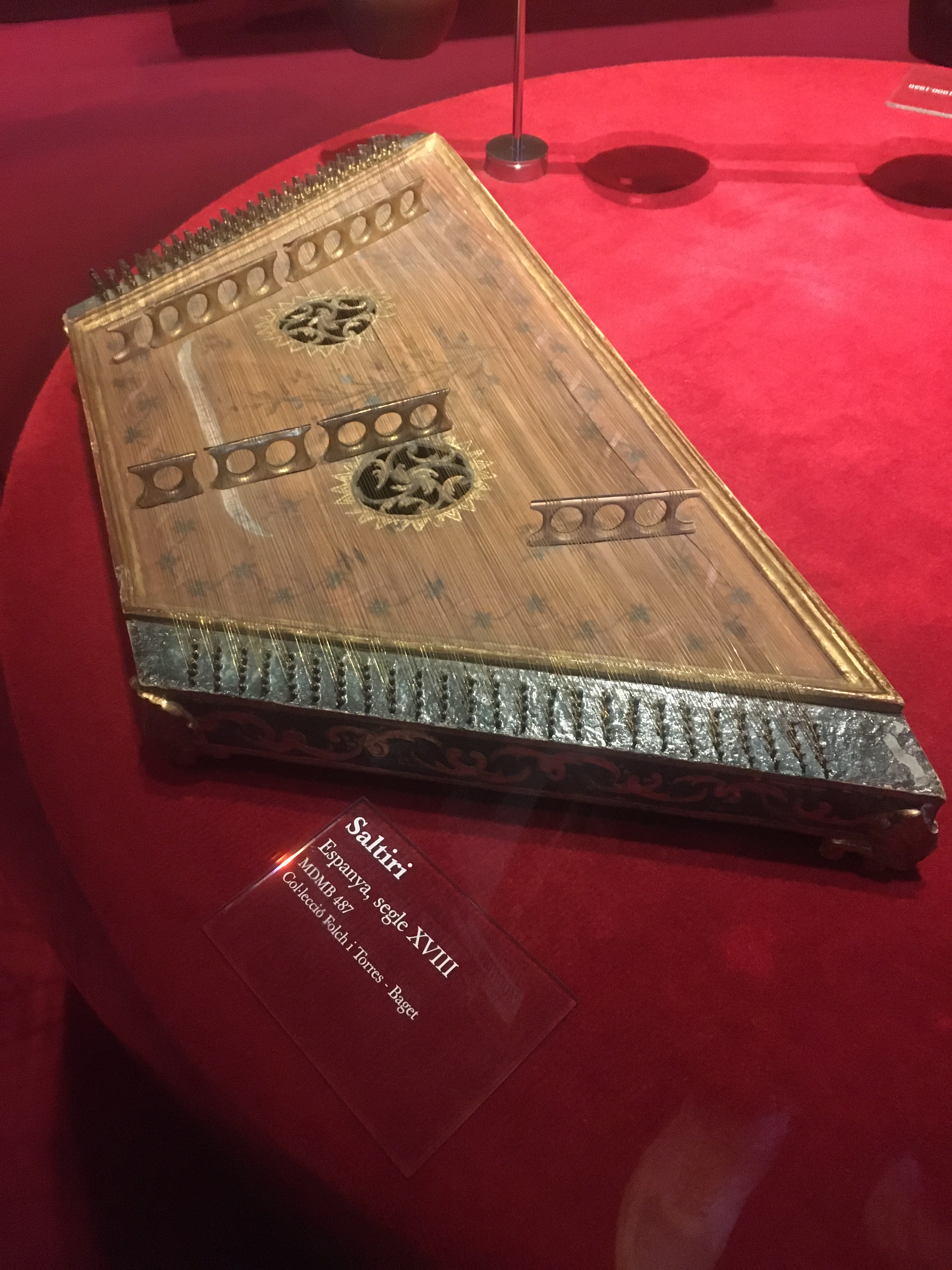
18th century Spanish psaltery. Trapezoidal psaltery.

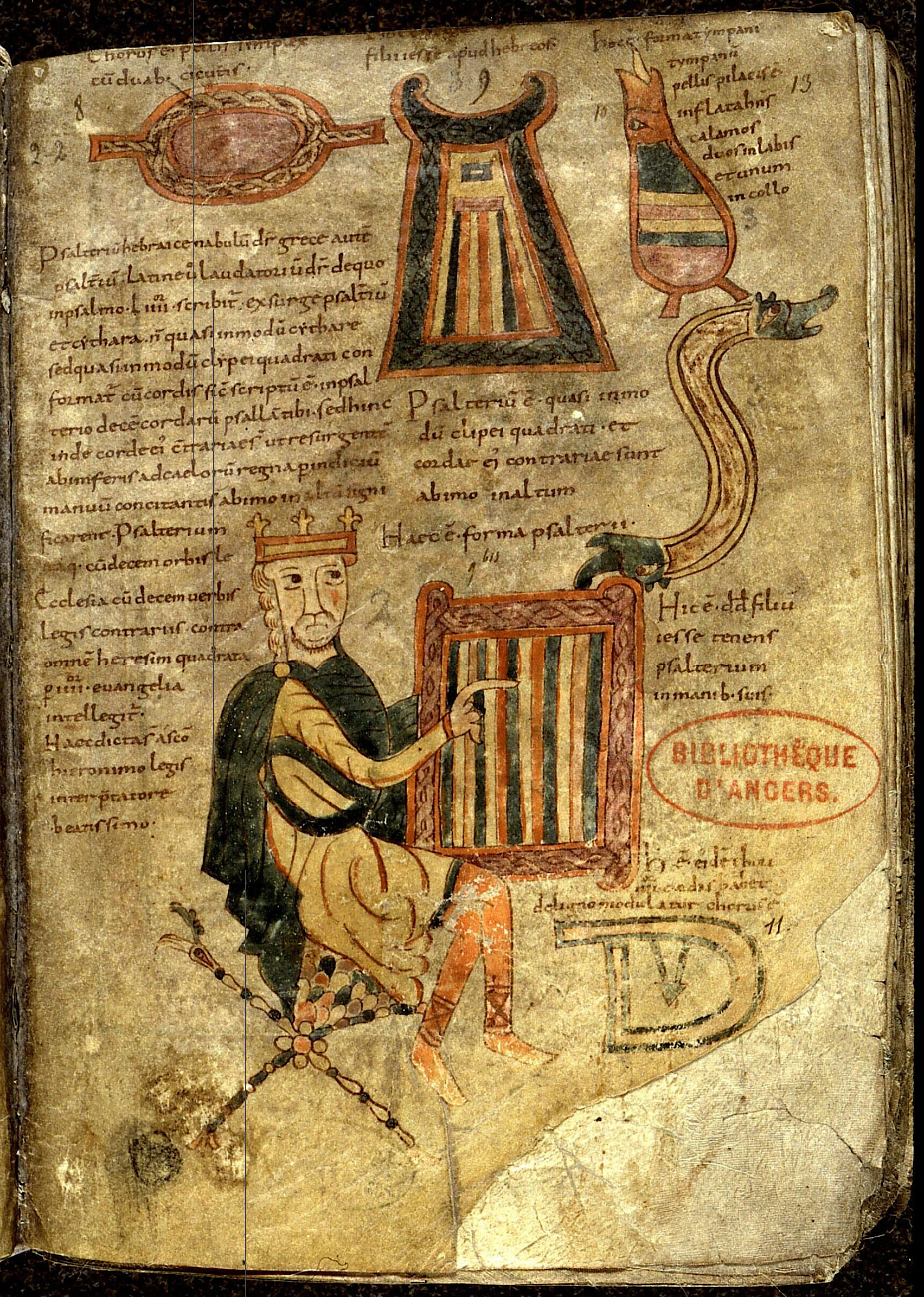
Carolingian Empire. Page from the Benedictine Psalter (842–850). David playing a four-sided psaltery, psalterium quadratum or psalterium decochordum.

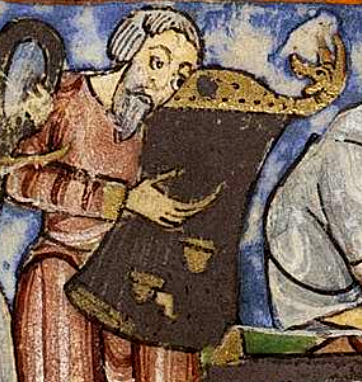
1020–1050, Germany. Musician with psaltery from Werdener Psalter.

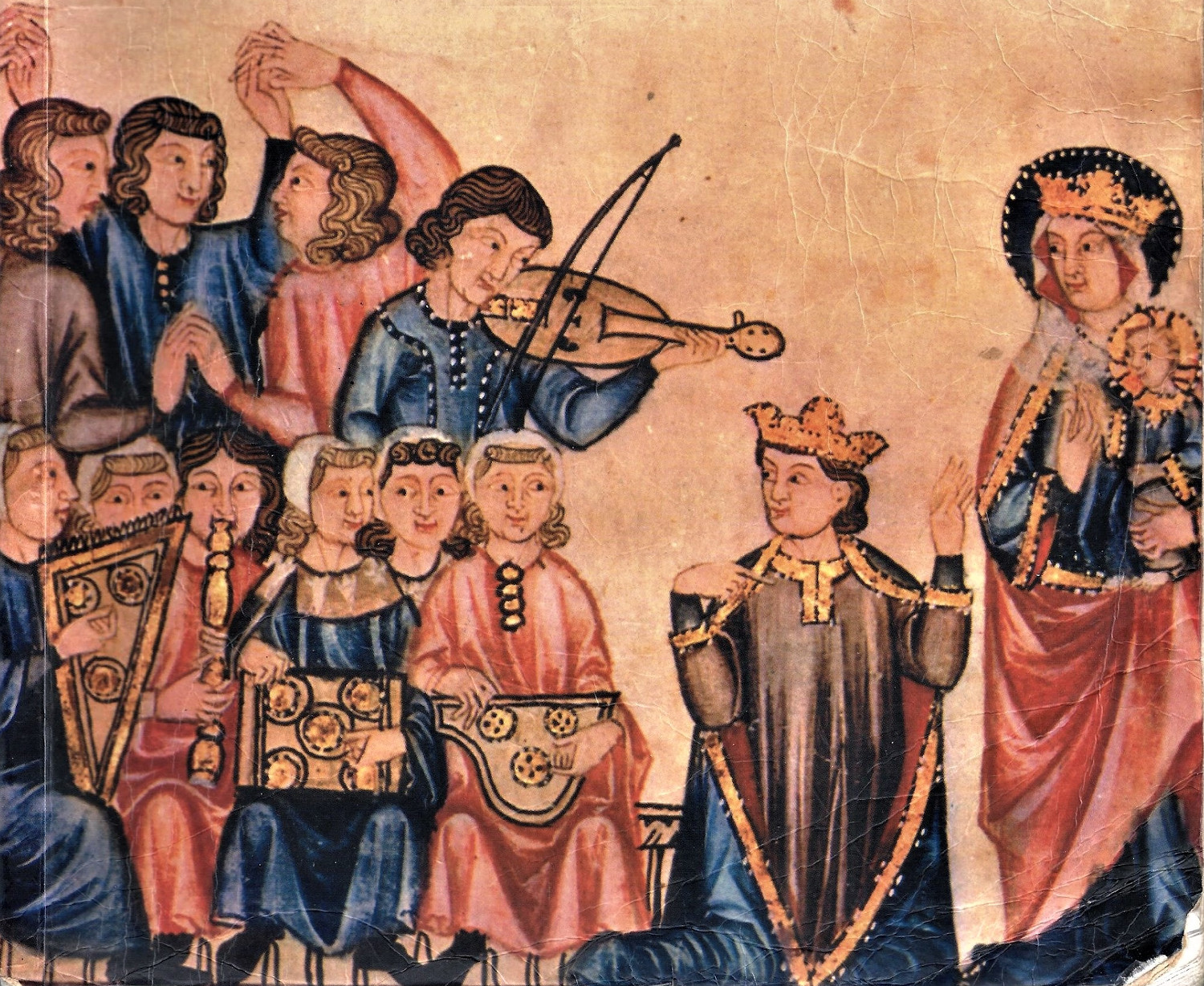
Spain. Three shapes of psalteries (bottom row) from the Cantigas de Santa Maria, Códice Rico.

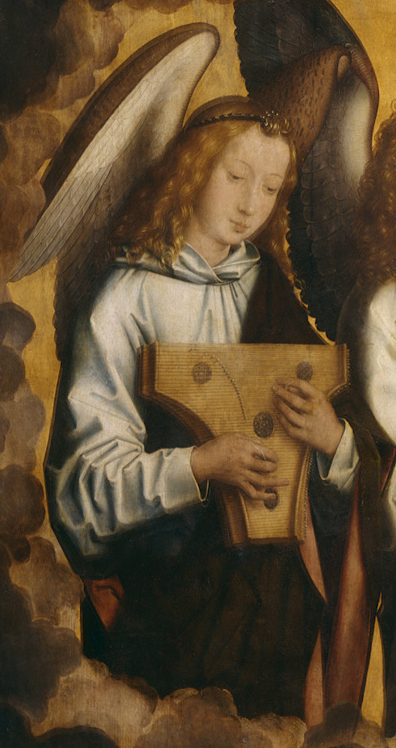
Germany, 15th century. Angel playing a pig's head psaltery.

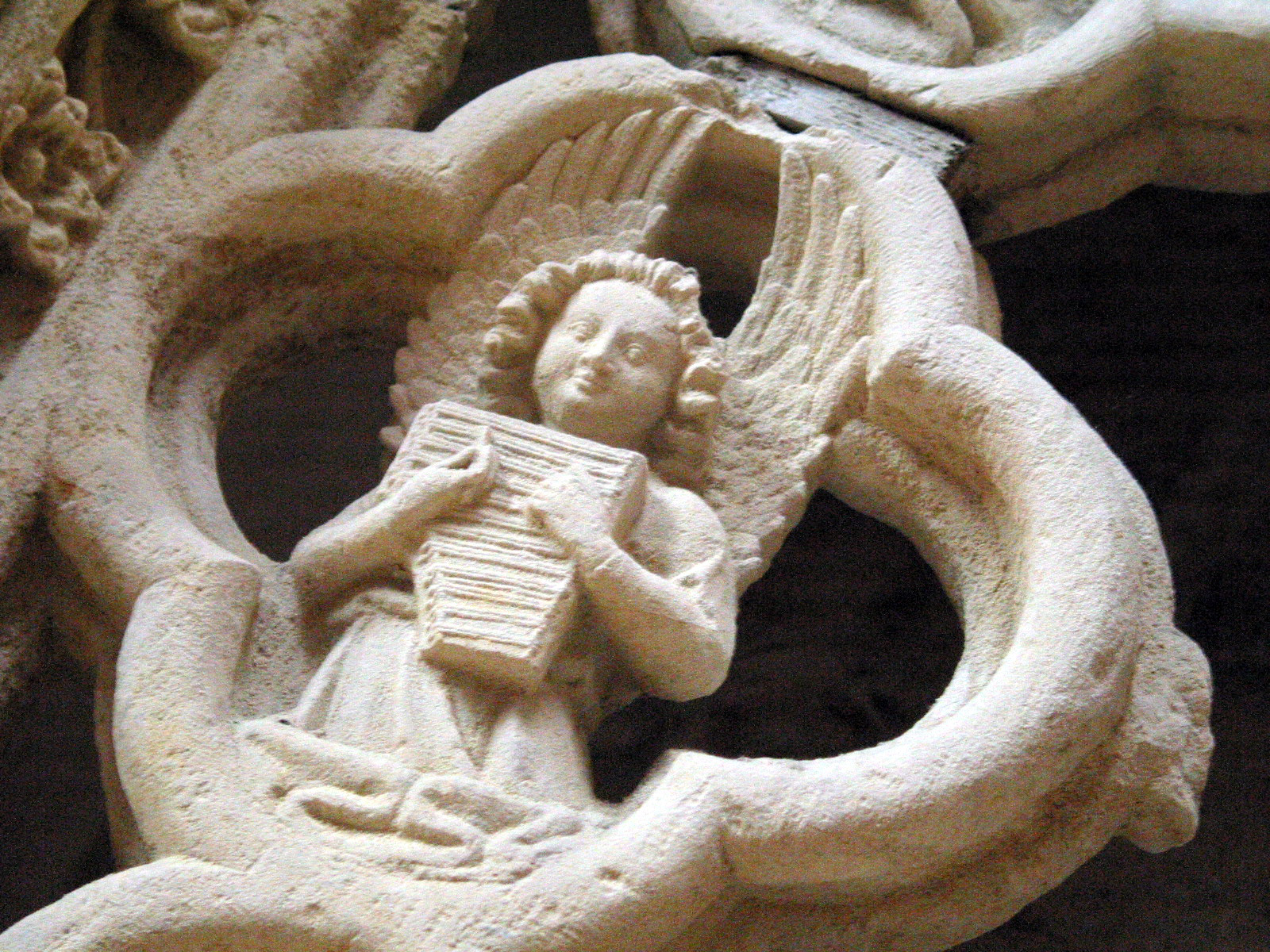
France

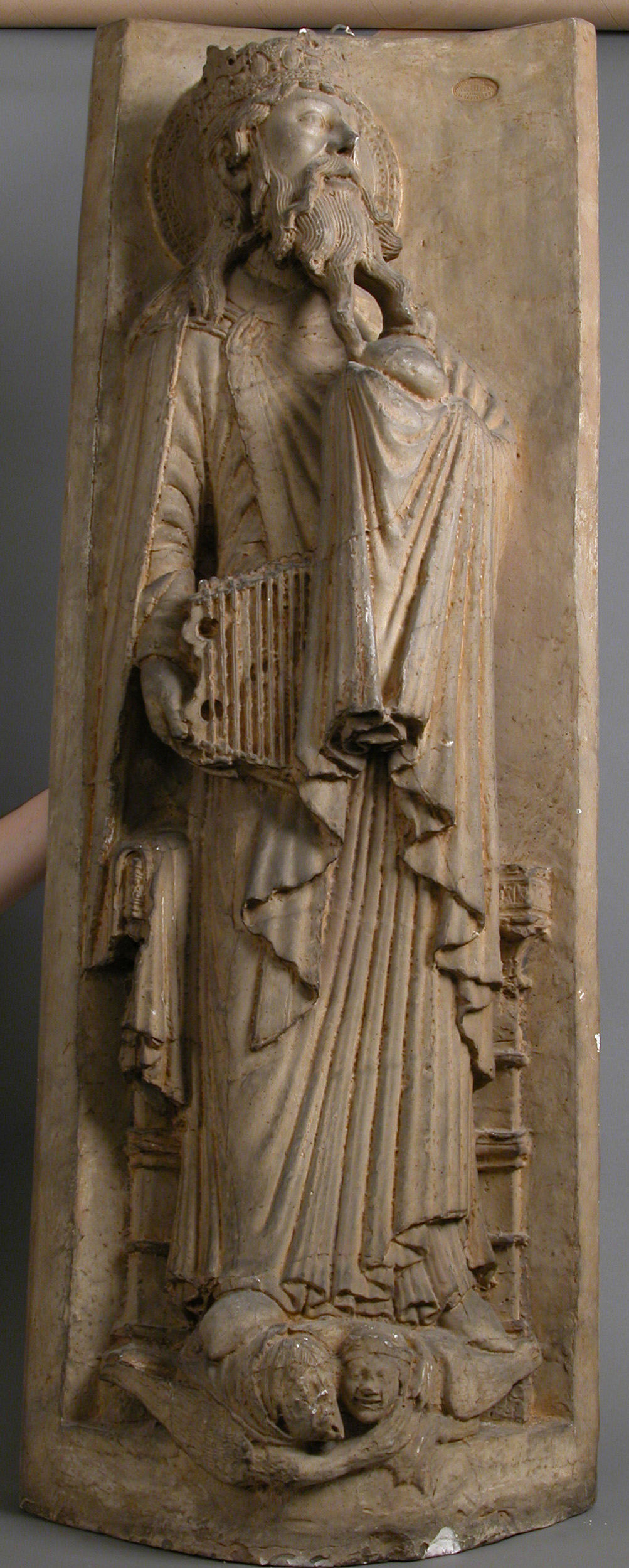
France. 1145–1155. Elder of the Apocalypse

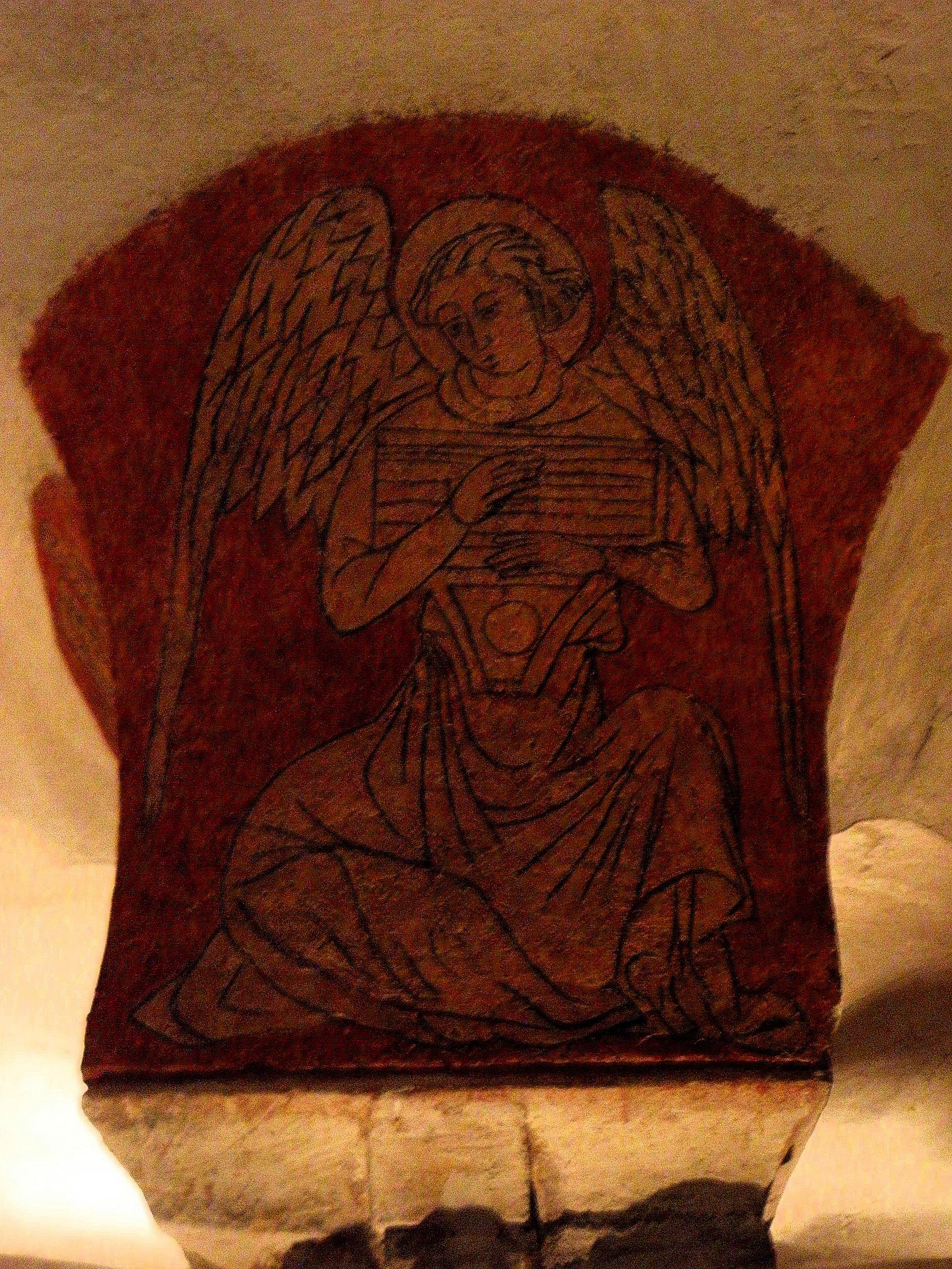
France, Notre Dame Cathedral

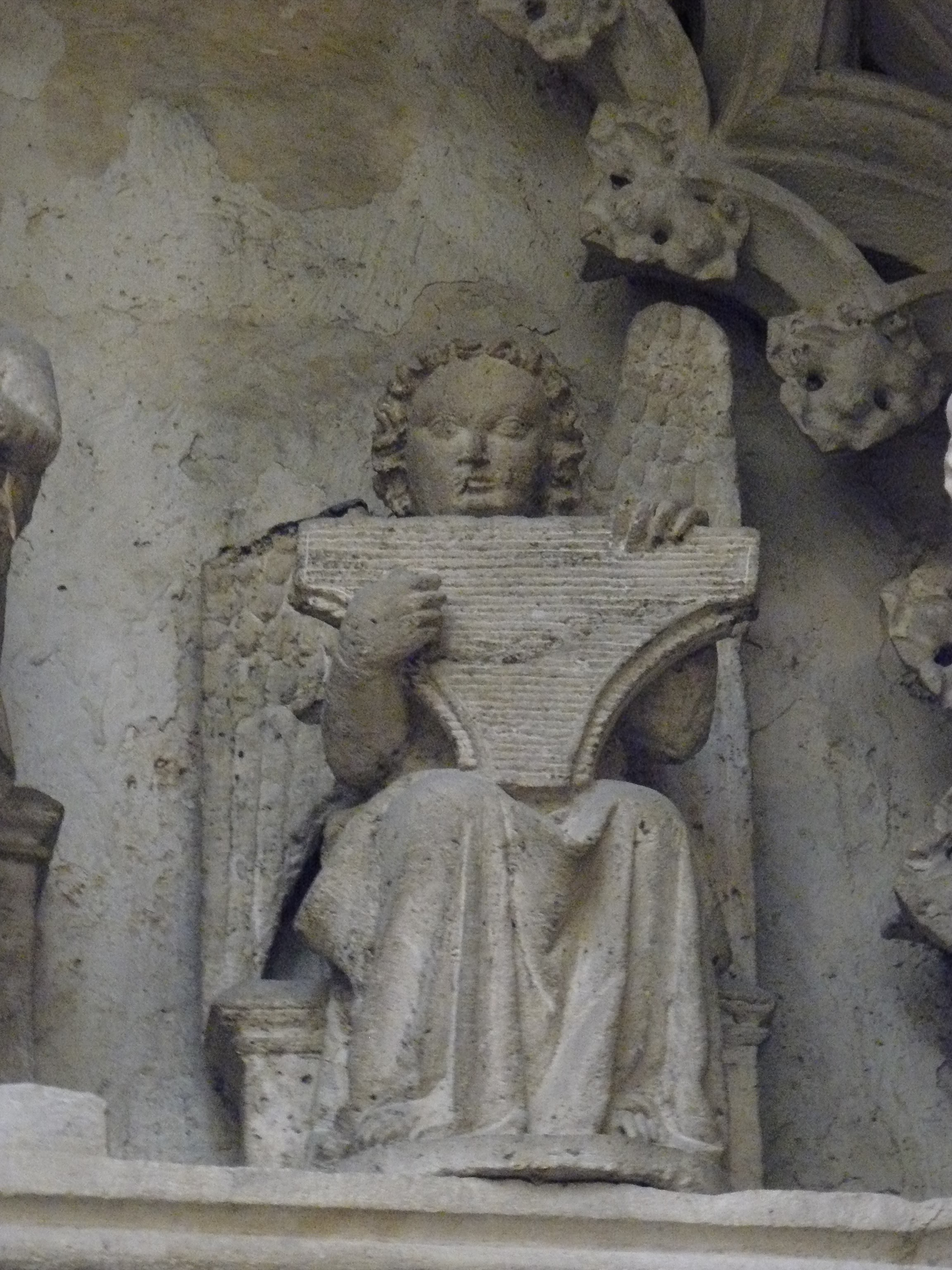
Spain. Burgos Cathedral.

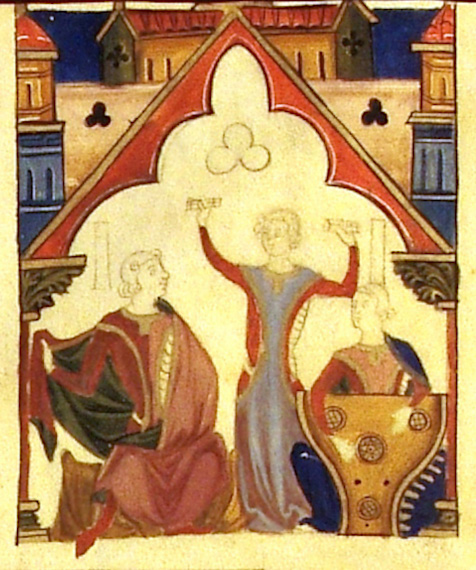
Spain, 13th century. Cancioneiro da Ajuda, folio 59, musicians with psaltery and clappers

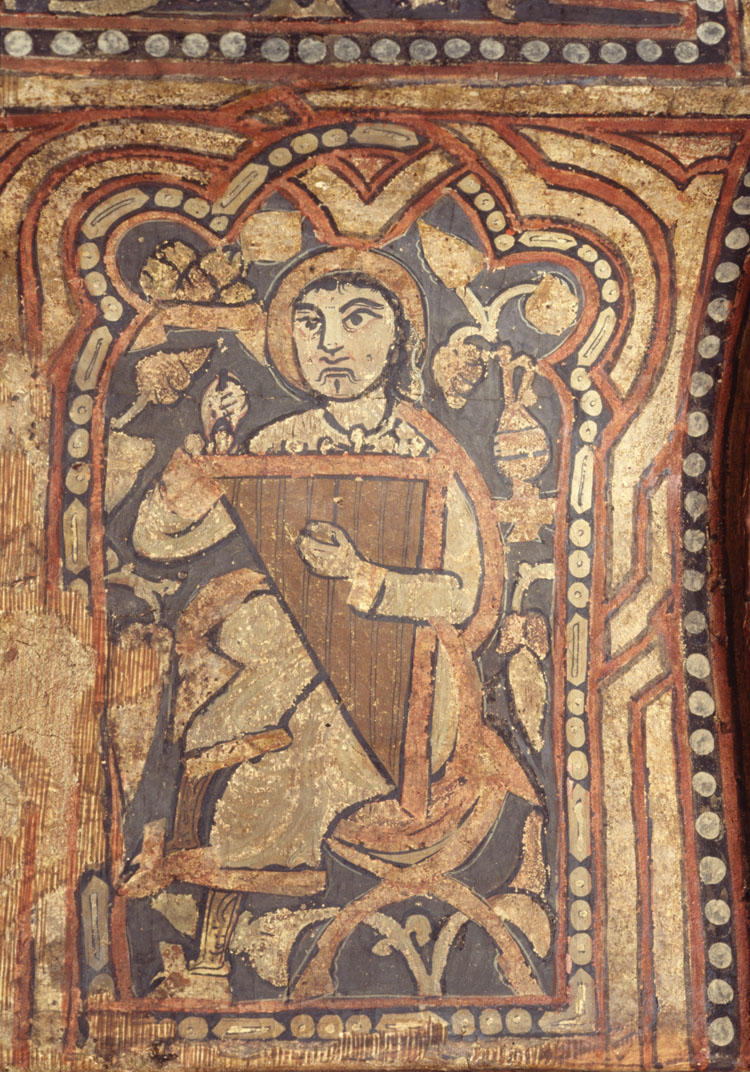
Triangular psaltery, Palatine Chapel, ca. 1140 A.D.

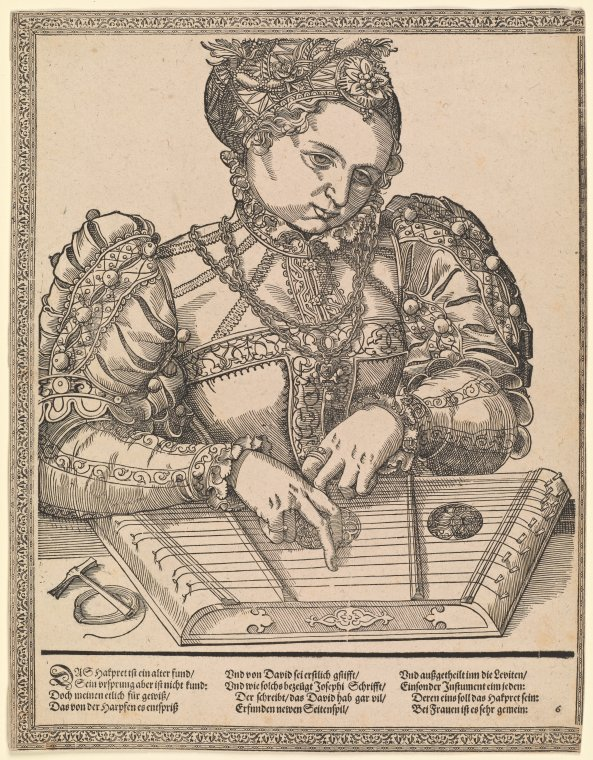
Woman playing psaltery, circa 1570 A.D.

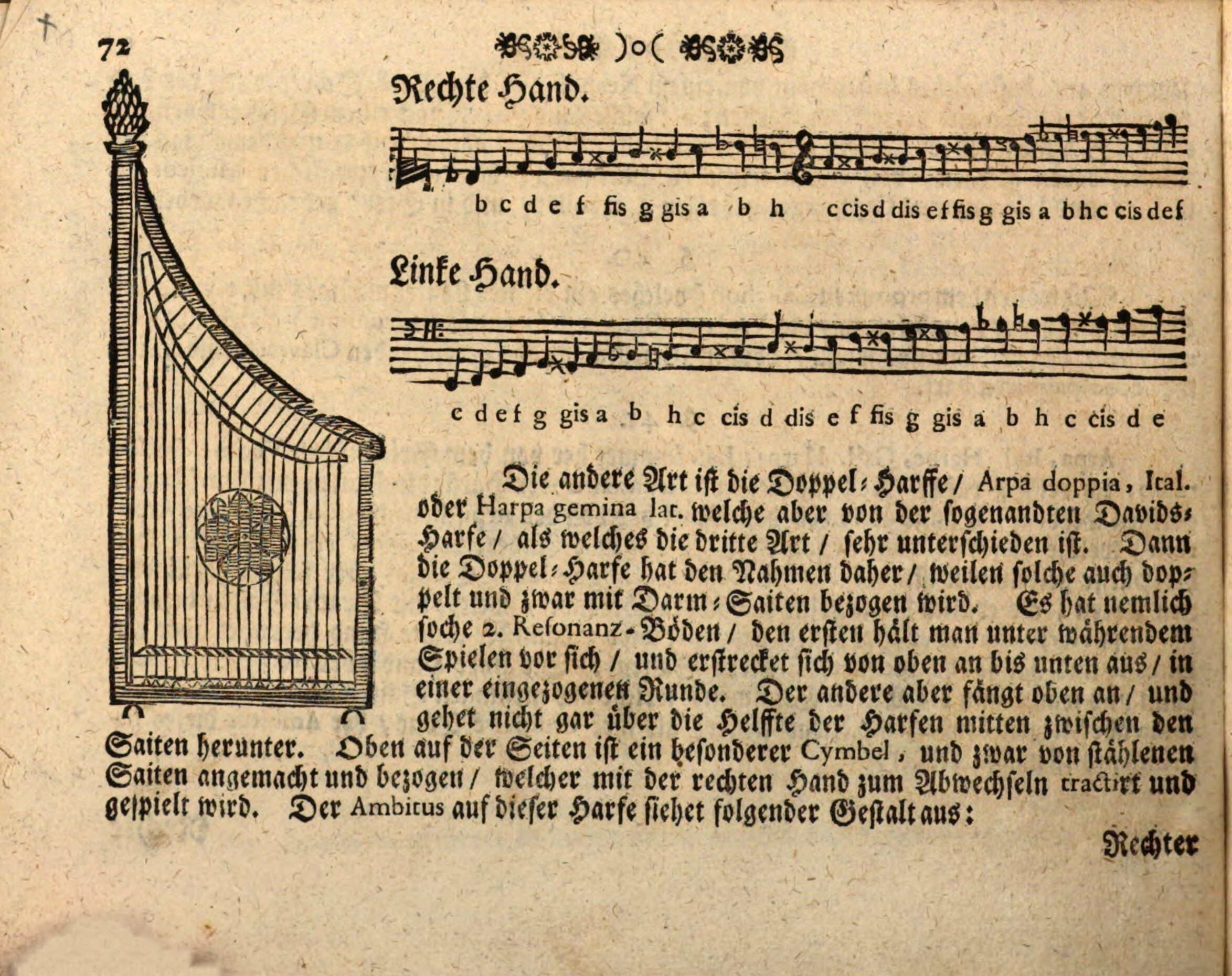
Psaltery notes, Museum musicum theoreticalo practicum page 72

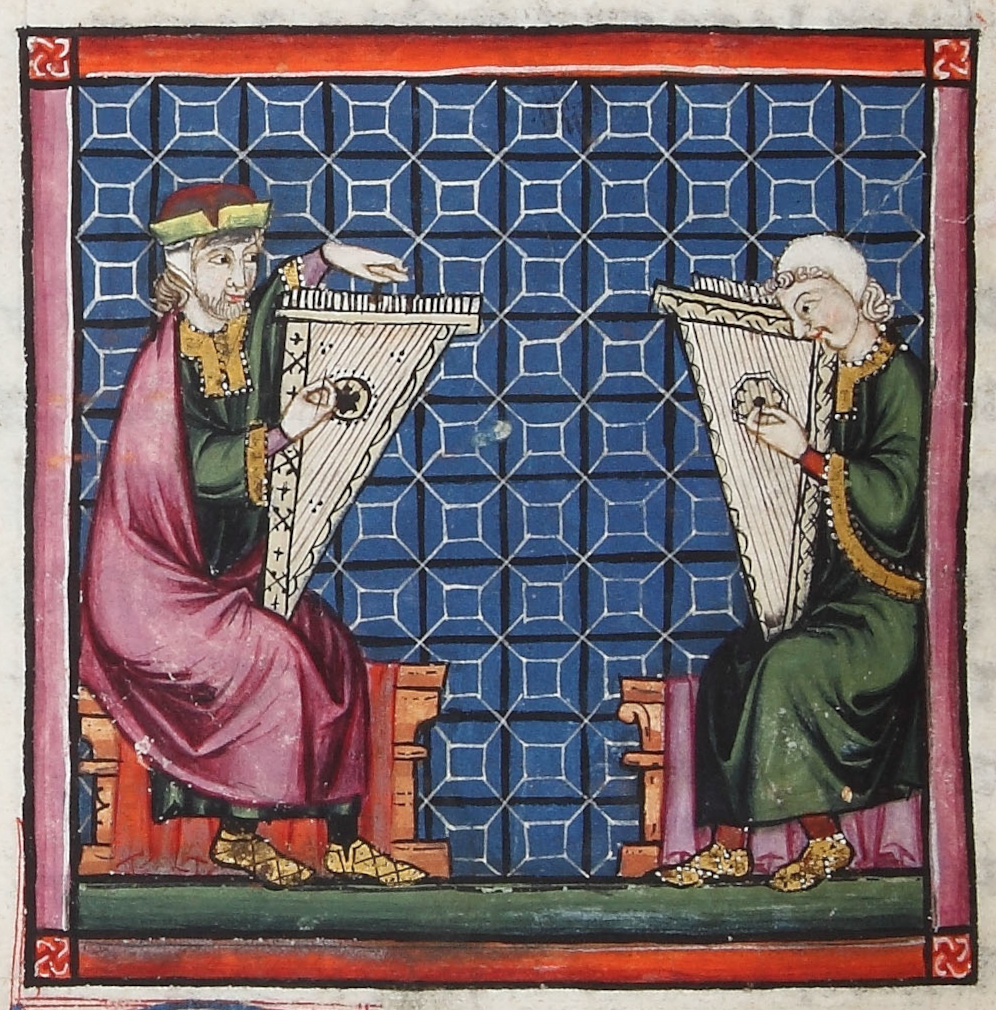
1280 A.D. Rotte. Cantigas de Santa Maria

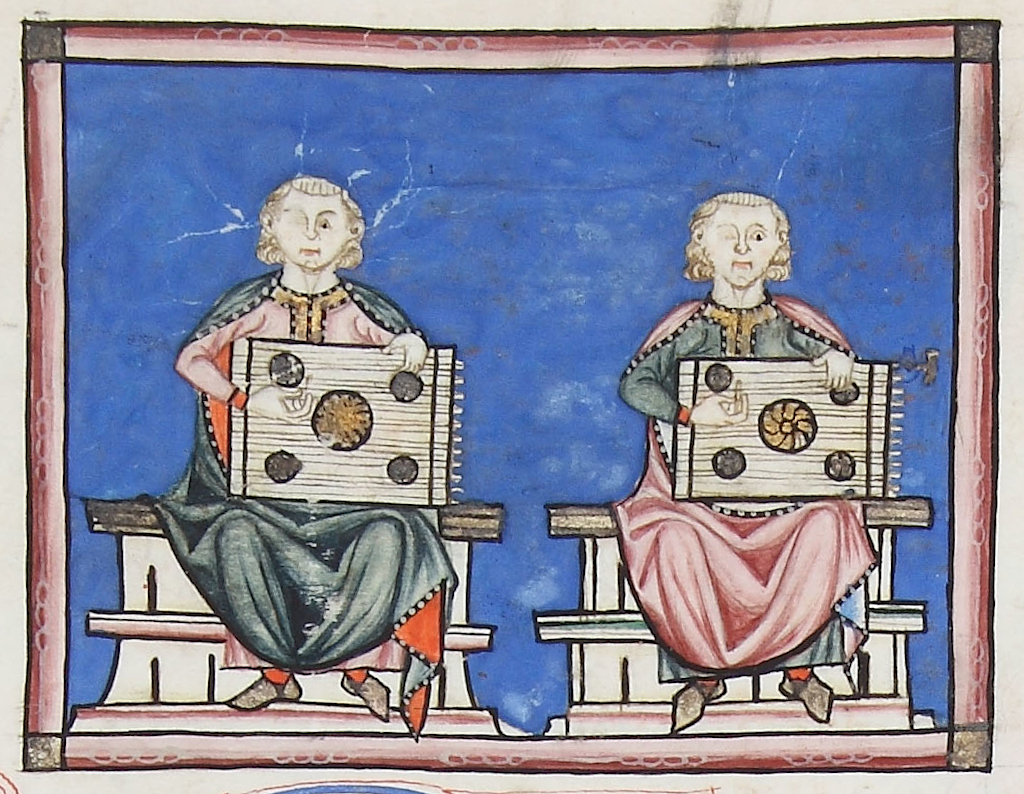
1280 A.D. Cantigas de Santa Maria

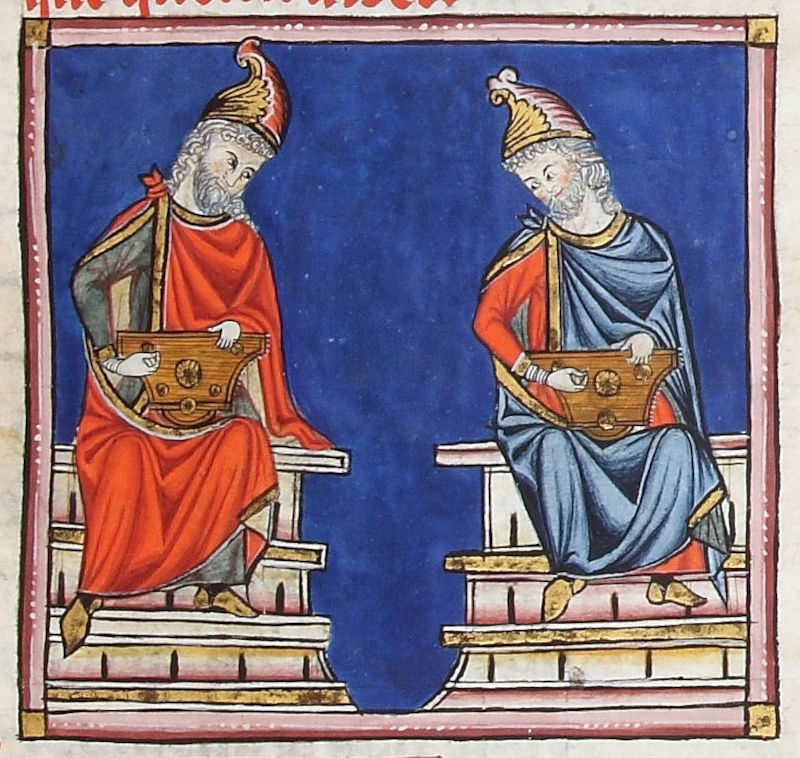
1280 A.D. Cantigas de Santa Maria.

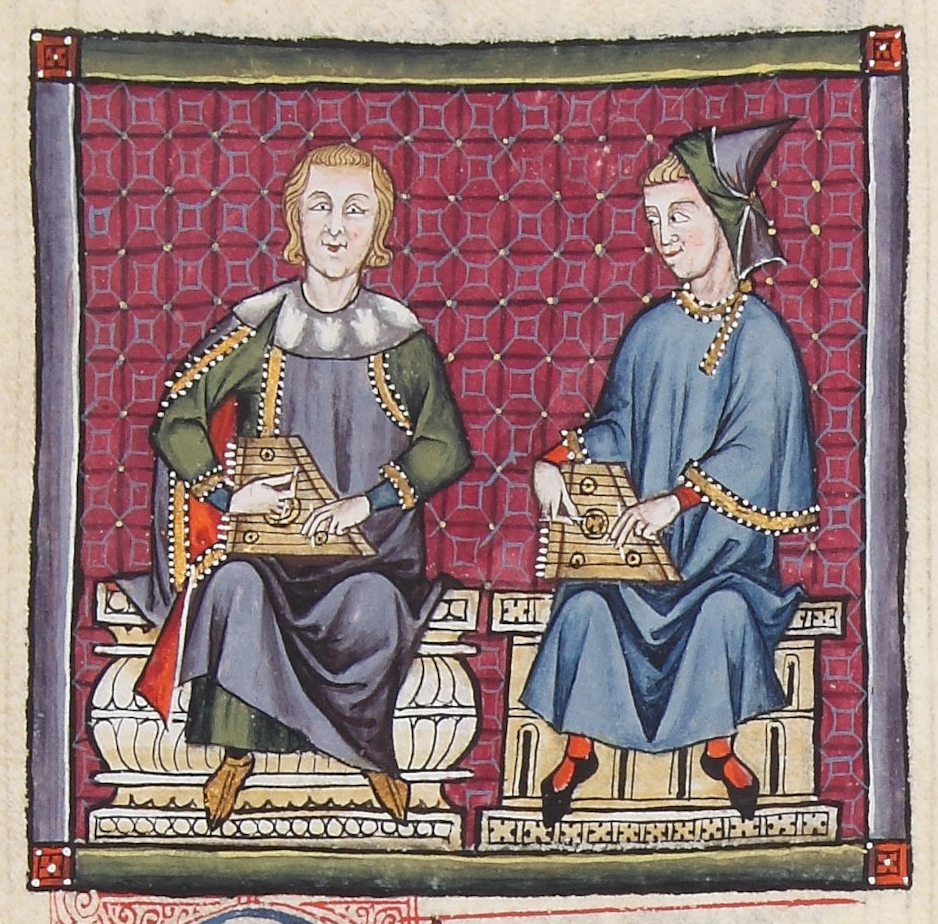
1280 A.D. Cantigas de Santa Maria.

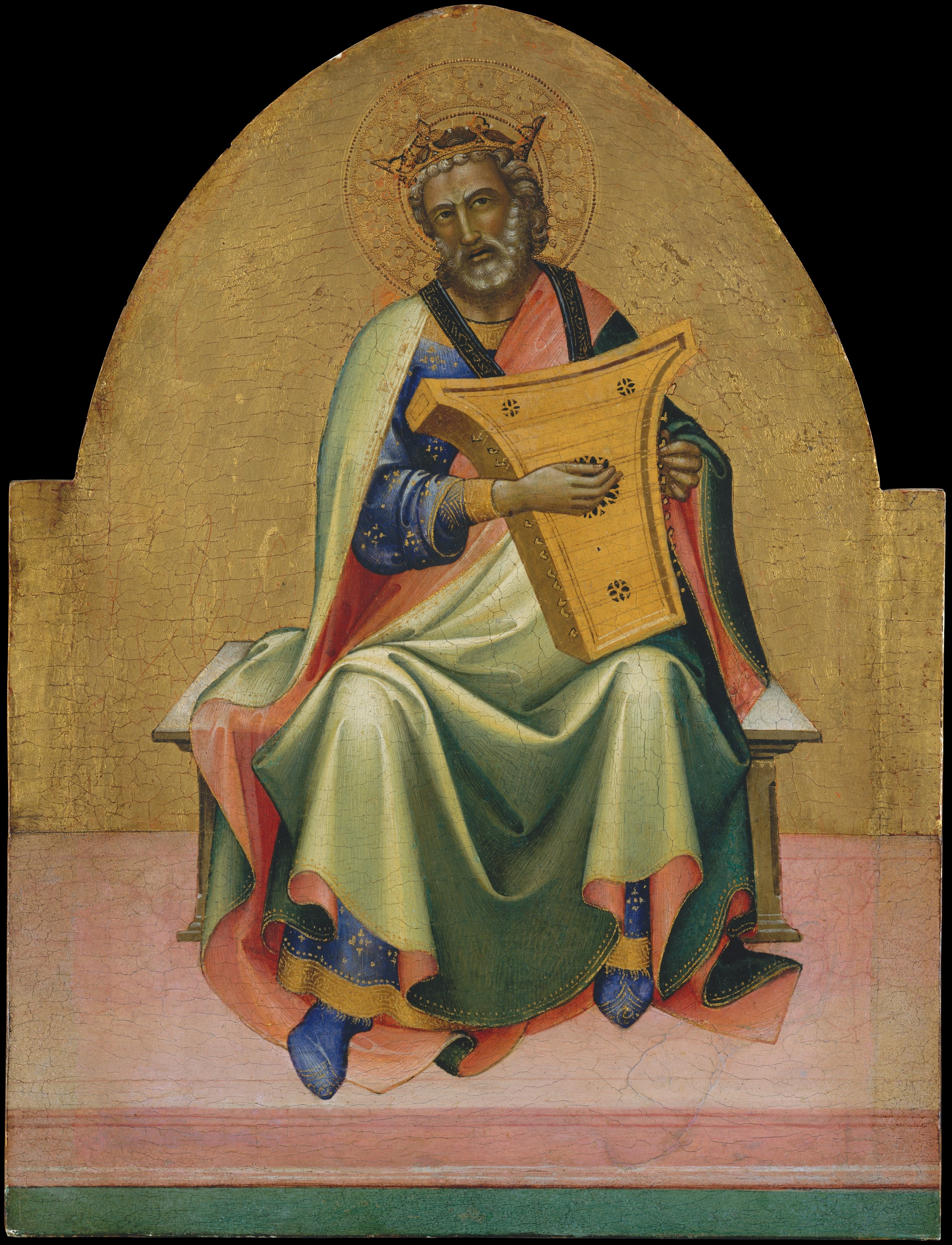
Circa 1408–1410, Italy. David playing a psaltery, painting by Lorenzo Monaco.

== See also ==
- Baltic psaltery
- Magadis
- Nevel (instrument)
- Qanun (instrument)
