= Chadagan =

Musical instrument

The chadagan (чадаган) is a Tuvan bridge zither. It usually has 16 strings and is tuned to a pentatonic scale. The number of strings varies, and the bridge is sometimes movable. Although it is usually plucked, it may also be played by striking with thin sticks, like a hammered dulcimer.

== Related instruments ==
Related instruments are the Finnish kantele, the Mongolian yatga, the Khakas chatkhan (or jadagan), the Japanese koto, and the Chinese guzheng.
