= Jetigen =

Kyrgyz string musical instrument

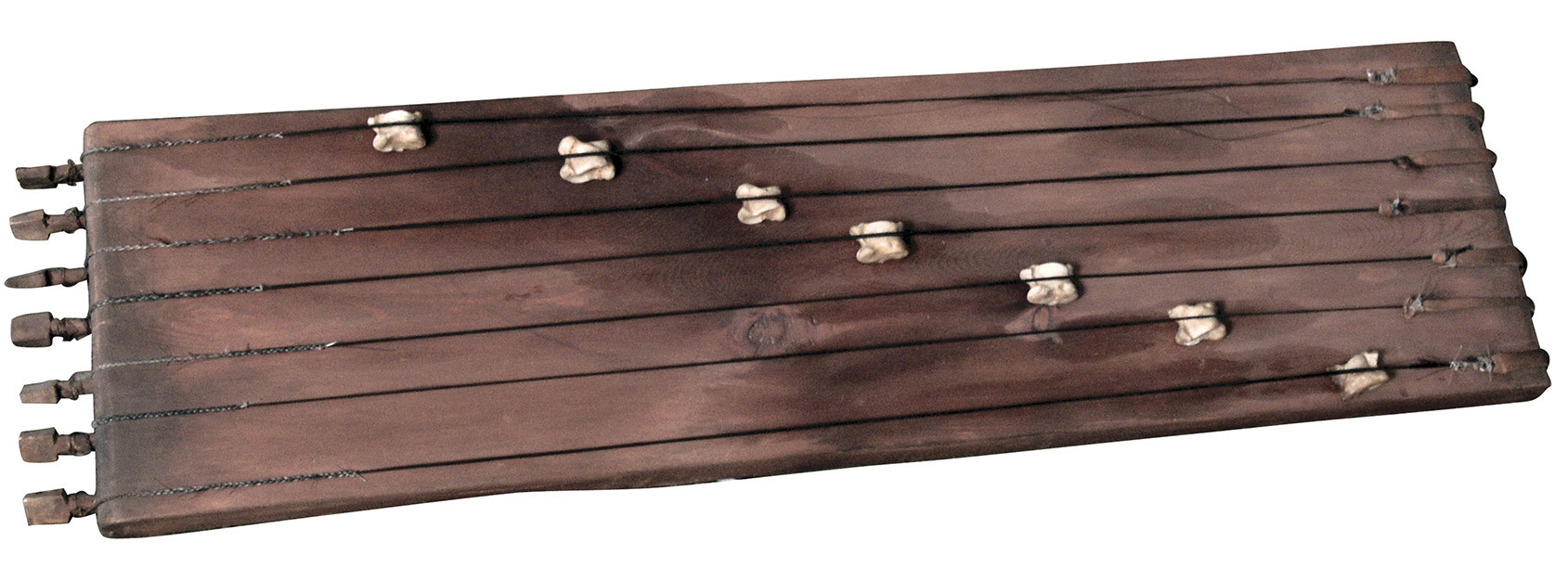

String instrument
- Other names: A Kyrgyz jetigen on display in the Kazakhstan National Museum of Instruments.
- Classification: String instruments; Box zither
- Developed: Antiquity

Related instruments
- yatga; koto; guzheng; gayageum; zither; Kanun (instrument); Jadagan; Đàn tranh; Kacapi; Se

The jetigen (Kazakh: жетіген, pronounced [ʒetɪˈɡen], or dzhetigan or zhetygen) is a Kazakh plucked zither. Similar to Chinese guzheng, yazheng and se, Japanese koto, Korean gayageum and ajaeng, Mongolian yatga, Vietnamese đàn tranh, and Sundanese kacapi. The strings were sometimes made of horsehair. The jetigen is played by plucking, in a similar manner to the gusli, tube zither or box zither.

The most ancient type of zhetygen had seven strings over a box shape hollowed out of a block of wood. Such zhetygen did not have the upper sounding board and pins. The strings were stretched by hand from the outer side of the instrument.

In later version of the instrument, the upper part of the zhetygen was covered with the wooden sounding board. Assyks were out under each string from two sides. Moving them it was possible to tune the string. If assyks were drawn closer to each other the tune was rising, and if drawn apart the tune was falling. String tuning was made by the pins and by moving the supports.

Early instruments took the form of a rectangular box, carved from wood, with strings stretched over the top. Later, a separate sounding board was added, and moveable supports were used to raise each string from the sounding board; the position of each support along its string determined the pitch of that string's note.

The jetigen is distinguished by its soft, melodious sound.

== Legendary history ==
In ancient times, an old man lived in one aul. He had seven sons. Once, during a cold winter, jute (a massive loss of livestock caused by icing of pastures or heavy snowfall, which makes cattle-grazing difficult) meant that people were left without food, and grief settled in the old man's house. One death after another took away all the sons. After the death of Kania's eldest son, the grief-stricken old man hollowed out a piece of withered wood, pulled a string on it and put a stand under it, performed the kyuy "Garagym" ("My dear"), after the death of Torealym's second son, the old father pulls the second string and improvises kyuy "Kanat sykar" ("Broken wing"), to the third son of Zhaikeldy he composes kyuy "Amarym" ("My favorite"); the fourth, Beken, is dedicated to the kyui "Ot suner" ("The Extinguished Flame"), the fifth son Hauas composes "Bayt Koshty" ("Lost Happiness"), the sixth son Zhulzar – "Kün tūtyldy" ("Eclipsed Sun"). After the loss of the last youngest son Kiyas, the old man pulls on the seventh string and sings the kyui "Zheti balamnan ayrylyp asa boldym" ("Woe from the loss of seven sons"). Extracting sounds full of sorrow from the instrument, the performer shows images of his children in melodies of different nature. These improvised melodies were further developed and came down to us in the form of instrumental pieces-kyuis under the general name "Jetigennin zheteui" ("Seven kyuis of Jetigen").

== Modern use ==
The jetigen can have a different number of strings: from 7, 14, 21 and up to 23, its weight can be 1 kilogram (2.2 lb), the length of the jetigen can exceed 1.5 metres (4 ft 11 in). Modern folklore ensembles use a reconstructed zhetygen, in which the number of strings was increased to 23 to expand the range. Tuning of strings is done by tuning pegs and moving the stands.
