= Jadagan =

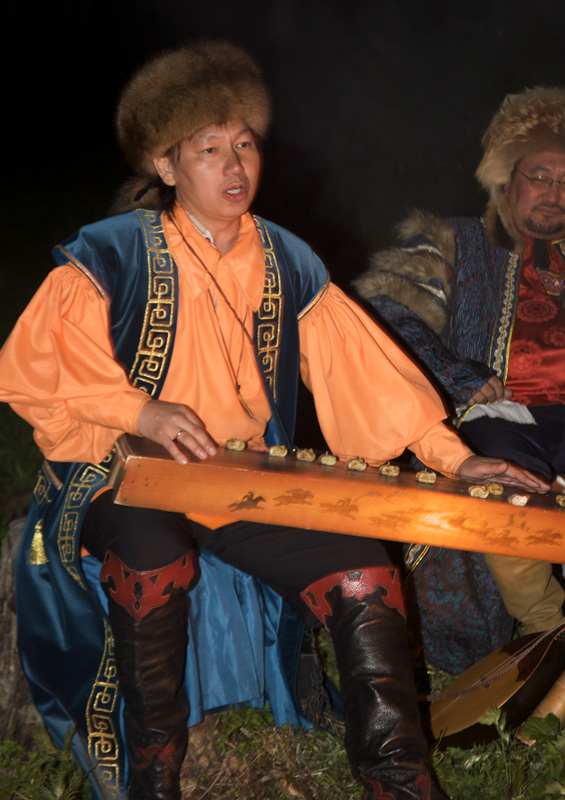

String instrument
- Classification: String instruments; Box zither
- Developed: Antiquity

Related instruments
- Yatga; Koto; Guzheng; Zither; Se; Gayageum; Đàn tranh; Kanun (instrument); Kanklės; Jetigen; Ajaeng; Yazheng

The jadagan (Khakas: чадыған, romanized: çadığan, Russian: чатхан, romanized: chatkhan, or Siberian harp) is a wooden board zither of the Khakas people in Siberia.

The jadagan usually has 6 or 7 strings stretched across movable bridges and tuned a fourth or fifth apart. The body is hollowed out from underneath like an upturned trough. It has a convex surface and an end bent towards the ground. The strings are plucked and the sound is very smooth. The length of the instrument is around 1.5 metres (59 in).

The instrument was considered to be sacrosanct and playing it was a rite bound to taboos. It was mainly used at court and in monasteries, since strings symbolised the twelve levels of the palace hierarchy.

== In the West ==
Folklorist Nancy Thym-Hochrein has researched the instrument, and musician Raphael De Cock is a contemporary player.

== Related instruments ==
- Yatga: Mongolia
- Koto: Japan
- Guzheng: China
- Zither
- Se: China
- Gayageum: Korea
- Đàn tranh: Vietnam
- Kanun (instrument)
- Kanklės: Lithuania
- Jetigen: Kazakhstan
- Ajaeng: Korea
- Yazheng: China
