= Wang Changyuan =

Chinese guzheng performer and composer

Wang Changyuan at the 2004 Yangzhou Guzheng Conference

Wang Changyuan (Chinese: 王昌元; pinyin: Wáng Chāngyuán; born 1945 or 1946 in Hangzhou, Zhejiang province, China) is a Chinese guzheng performer and composer.

The only daughter of the eminent guzheng master Wang Xunzhi, she graduated from the Shanghai Conservatory of Music in 1969 and in 1984 came to the United States to study world music at Kent State University.

Wang Changyuan is the composer of the famous guzheng solo piece, Zhan Tai Feng (Chinese: 战台风, "The Fight with the Typhoon"), a dramatic depiction of fight of the Shanghai harbour proletariat against the forces of nature, while protecting the property of the people and the Chinese communist government. She composed the work in 1965 while living for three months in the dormitories of the Shanghai harbour and sharing her quarters with the workers there.

Wang lives in Rego Park, Queens, New York and teaches in Manhattan, Queens, and in nearby New Jersey. She occasionally performs in the New York metro area, by herself or with her students. Her students include many prominent world-class guzheng soloists, among whom are Xu Lingzi (Hong Kong), Sha Lijing (China), Ma Li (United States), Fiona Sze-Lorrain (France/United States), and Thomas Thuan Dang Vu 鄧武舜 (United States).

== See also ==
- Guzheng
