= Đàn tranh =

Vietnamese string instrument

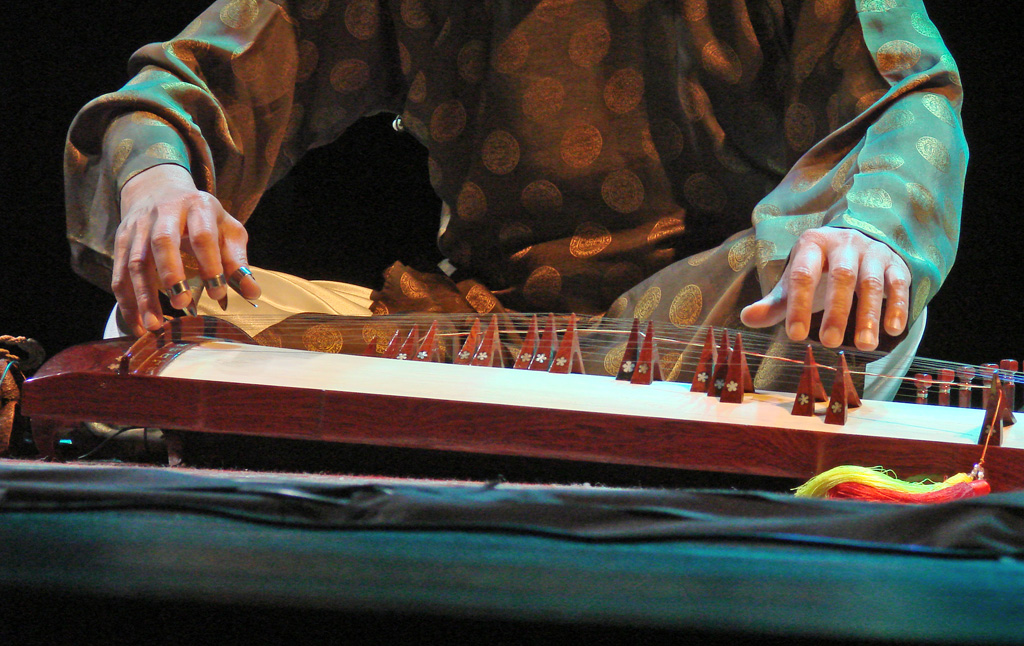

String instrument
- Other names: 16-stringed đàn tranh
- Classification: Stringed instrument
- Hornbostel–Sachs classification: 312.22–6 (Heterochord half-tube zither sounded with three plectrums)
- Inventor: China
- Developed: 13th century

Related instruments
- Se; Koto; Zheng; Yatga; Gayageum; Jetigen

Musicians
- Nguyễn Vĩnh Bảo

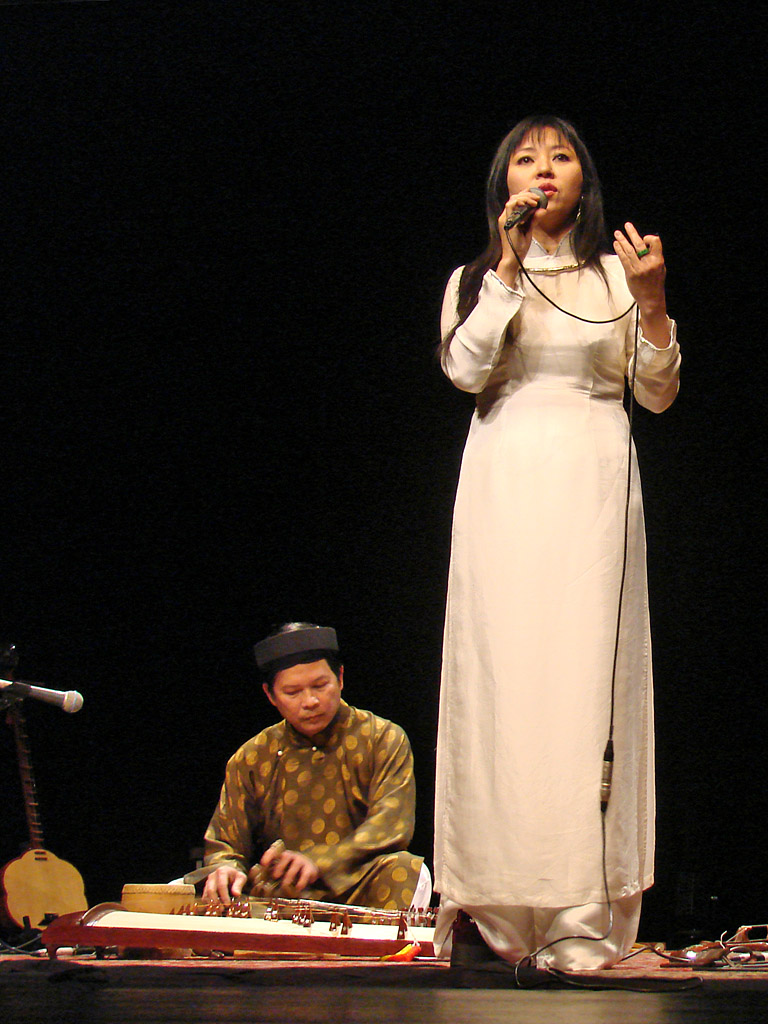
A man playing the đàn tranh beside the singer.

The đàn tranh (Vietnamese: [ɗâːn ʈajŋ̟], 彈箏) or đàn thập lục is a plucked zither of Vietnam, based on the Chinese guzheng, from which are also derived the Japanese koto, the Korean gayageum and ajaeng, the Mongolian yatga, the Sundanese kacapi and the Kazakh jetigen. It has a long soundbox with the steel strings, movable bridges and tuning pegs positioned on its top.

The đàn tranh can be used either as a solo instrument, as part of various instrumental ensembles or to accompany vocal performances.

== History ==
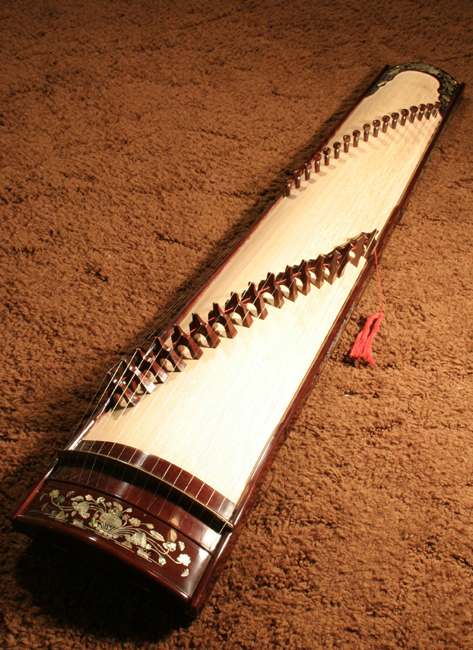
Đàn tranh with 17 strings

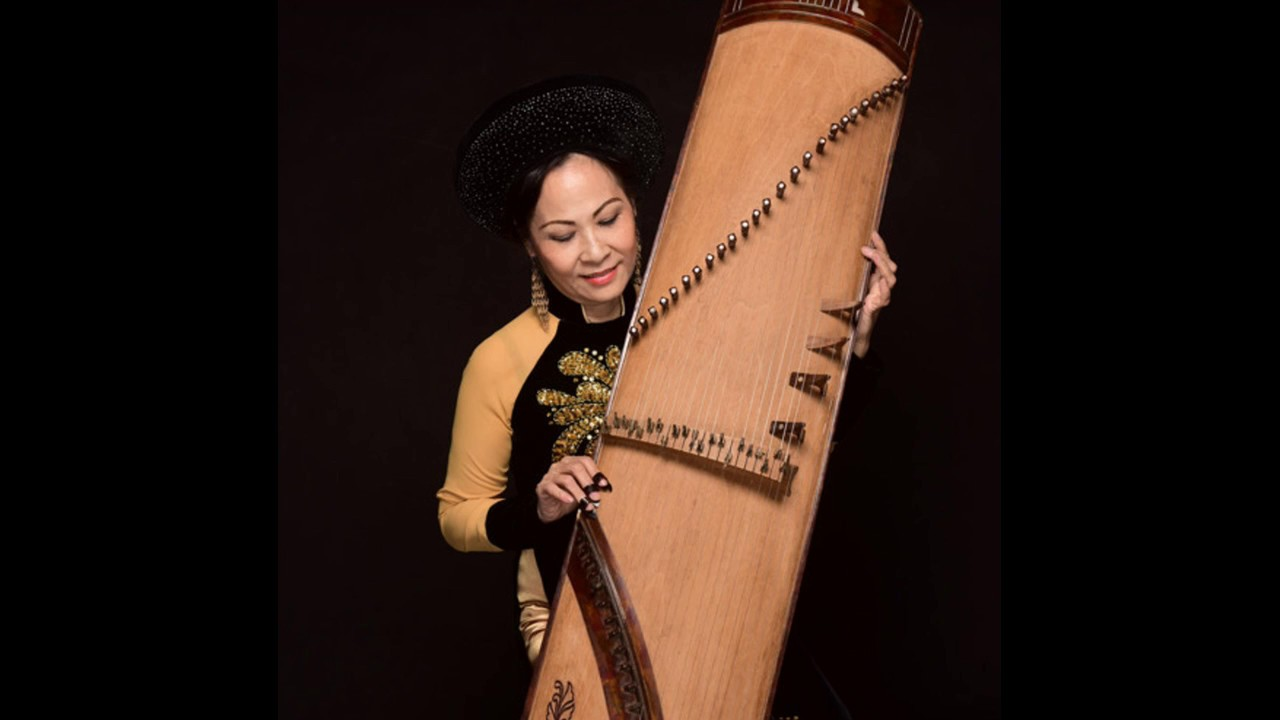
Improved đàn tranh

The Vietnamese 's đàn tranh came from the Chinese Chaozhou zheng. In the late 13th and early 14th centuries, the đàn tranh had 14 strings. Between the late 15th and the 18th centuries, the number of strings of the đàn tranh increased to fifteen and the instrument was called thập ngũ huyền cầm. In the 19th centuries, the đàn tranh with 16 strings appeared and had become the standard version until the late 1970s and early 1980s.

The Vietnamese đàn tranh, the Japanese koto and the Korean gayageum, are descended from Chinese guzheng.

== Description ==
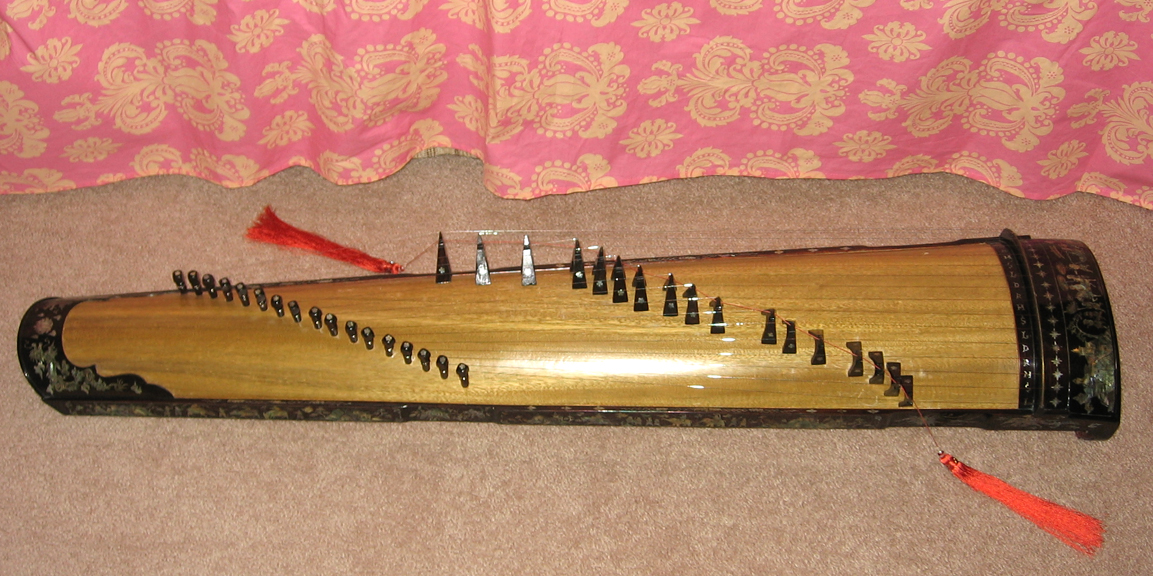
Đàn tranh close-up photo

The body of the đàn tranh is between 104 and 120 cm in length. The soundbox consists of a curved top plate, a flat bottom plate, and six side-pieces. The top and bottom plates are usually made of Paulownia wood. The side-pieces as well as the bridges, and tuning pegs and the two small legs are made of hard wood. The movable bridges have the shape of the letter V turned upside down, and their sizes varies according to their position: The one for the lowest string is the largest. The higher their position, the smaller their size is. The strings are made of steel and have varying diameters. They are tuned to the pentatonic scale. Performers usually wear picks made of metal, plastic, or tortoise-shell to pluck the strings.

The standard version of the đàn tranh had 16 strings and had been used between the nineteenth century and the late 1980s. In the late 1950s, South Vietnamese master musician and instrumental designer Nguyễn Vĩnh Bảo (born 1918) began to design and construct instruments with 17, 19 and 21 strings. By the late 1980s, the 17-stringed đàn tranh has become the standard version of the instrument used throughout Vietnam. Larger instruments with 22, 24 and 25 strings have also been made in the 1980s and 1990s.

== Playing techniques ==
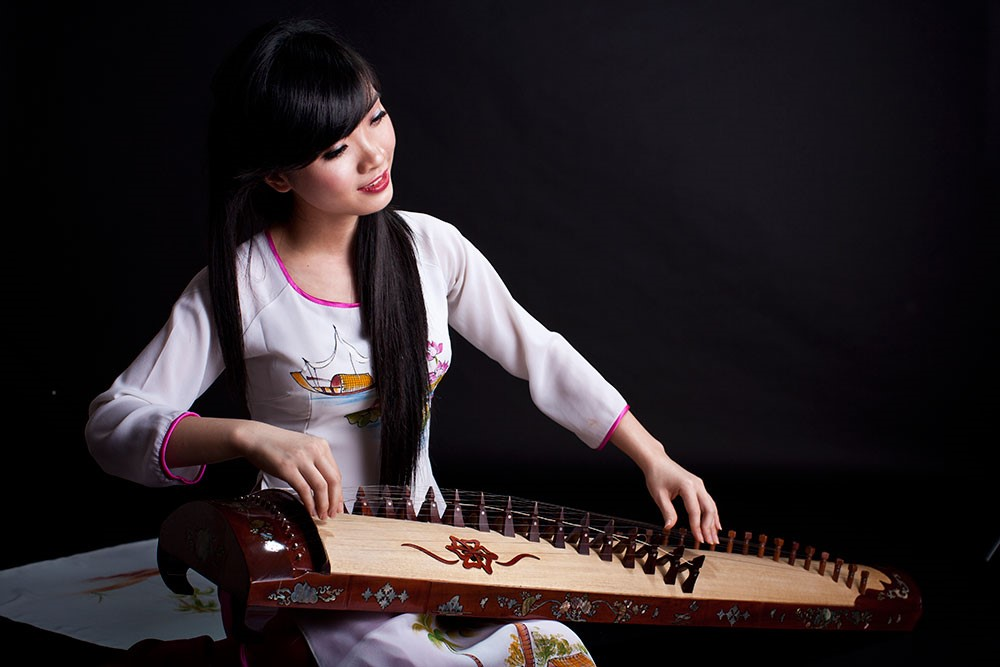
A lady is playing the đàn tranh

Performers pluck the strings with the right hand and bend the strings with the left hand to create a wide range of microtonal and tonal ornaments. In traditional music, performers use 2 or 3 fingers (thumb and index, or thumb, index and middle fingers) to pluck the strings. In a number of new compositions, as many as four or five fingers may be used to pluck the strings. In these new works, the left hand may also be used to enable the performer to play two simultaneous parts. Sometimes, đàn tranh will play with bow, the player traditionally bowing the strings to the right of the bridges while the left hand varied pitch and vibrato by pressing the strings on the other side of the bridges.

== Audio examples ==
- "Khúc Ngẫu Hứng trên Hò Đồng Tháp / Inspiration on a River Song (1982), composed and performed by Đặng Kim Hiền on a 22-stringed đàn tranh designed and made by the late master instrumental maker Tín Thanh". 15 January 2014.

== See also ==
- Gayageum
- Guzheng
- Kacapi
- Koto (musical instrument)
- Se (instrument)
- Yatga
