= Yatga =

Traditional Mongolian string instrument

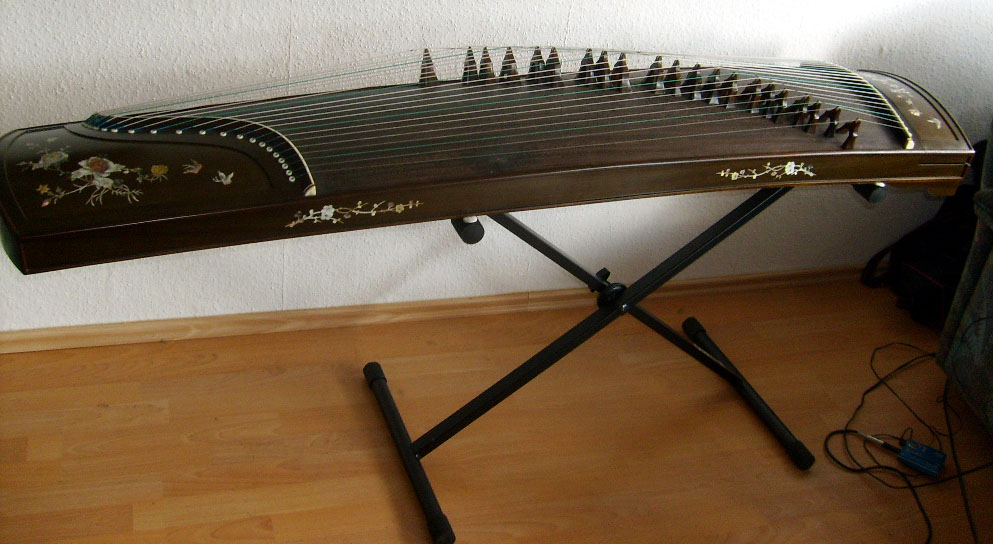
- Mongolian yatga

String instrument
- Classification: Chordophone: Plucked string instrument; Box zither
- Hornbostel–Sachs classification: 312.22-5 (Heterochord half-tube zithers)
- Developed: Antiquity

Related instruments
- Guzheng; Gayageum; Geomungo; Koto; Jetigen; Jadagan

The yatga (Mongolian: ᠶᠠᠲᠤᠭ᠎ᠠ, romanized: yatug-a, Khalkha dialect: ятга, yatga; pronounced [ˈjɑtʰəq]; is a traditional plucked zither of Mongolia.

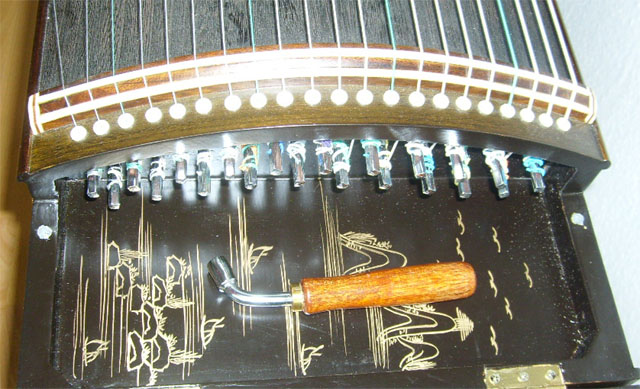
Tuning bridge of a Mongolian Yatga

Yatga may vary widely in size, tuning, and number of bridges and strings; The body is a long wooden box, one end of which is angled downward. The performer plucks the strings with the fingernails of the right hand; the left hand is used to put pressure on the strings, varying the note. The left hand can also be used to play the bass strings without plectrums (picks). Depending on style the higher strings are picked by fingers or by picks.

Similar instruments include the Chinese guzheng, se and yazheng, Korean gayageum and ajaeng, the Vietnamese đàn tranh, the Japanese koto, the Kazakh jetigen, and the Sundanese kacapi.

The most common type of yatga in contemporary use is the twenty one-stringed version. This type of yatga is also called a "master yatga." The length of a full-size instrument is 1.62m or 63 inches. Shorter versions are pitched higher. A 13-stringed version is called gariin yatga, "hand yatga".

The strings are made either from silk, horse hair or goose gut.

Usually the strings are tuned pentatonic. The most common tune is C D E G A (Do Re Mi So La) or different tunes.

== History ==
The Yatga descended from the guzheng. Historically, the twelve-stringed version was used at the royal court for symbolic reasons; the twelve strings corresponded to twelve levels of palace hierarchy. The commoners had to play on a 10-stringed yatga. The usage of the 12 or more stringed version was reserved for the court and monasteries.

The traditional Mongolian epic Janggar tells the story of a young princess who once played upon an 800-string yatga with 82 bridges; she is supposed to have only played on the seven lower bridges.

== Playing technique ==
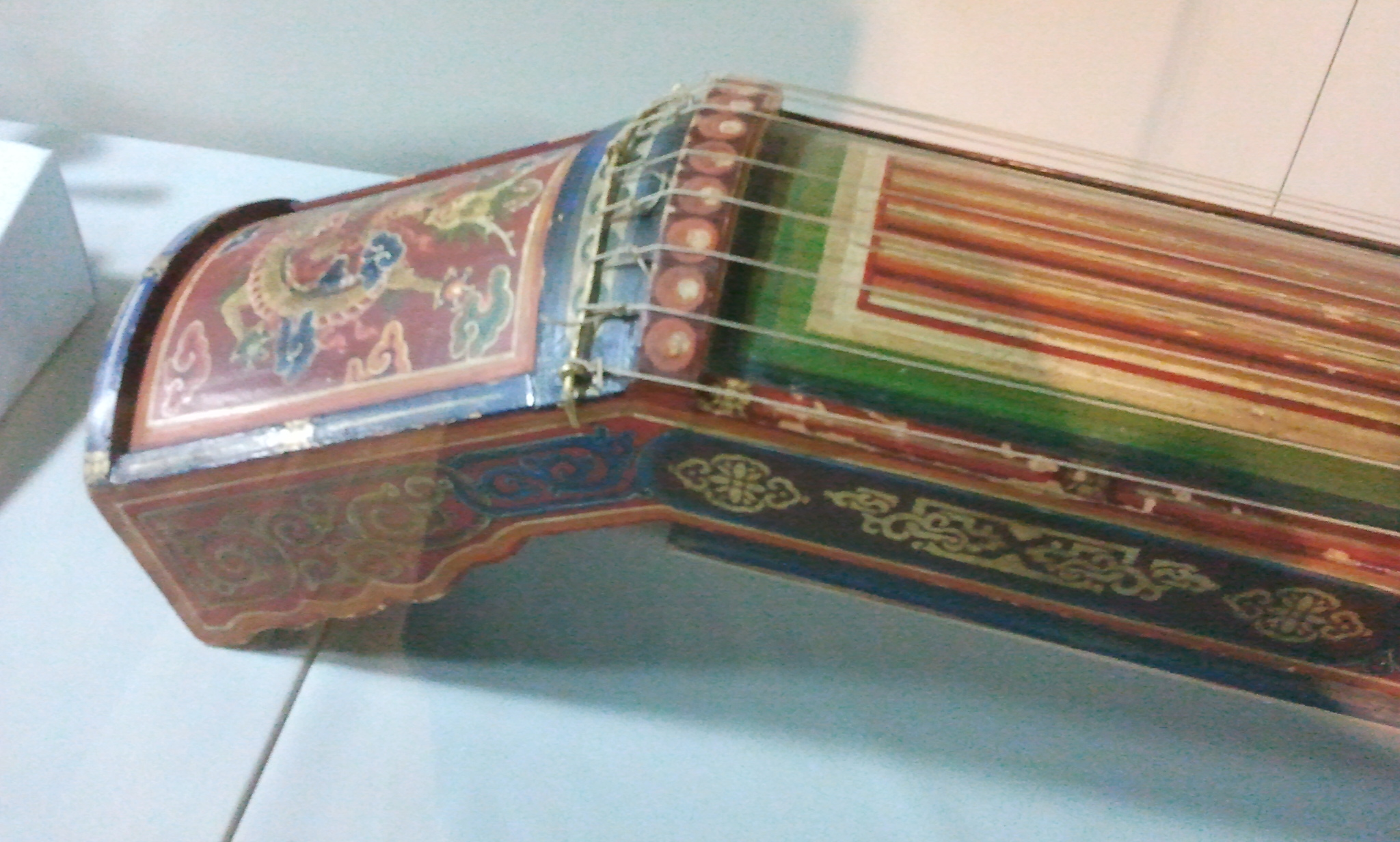
Old Mongolian yatga.

One end of the yatga is placed on the knees of the performer, the other end will be on the floor or will be put on a stand. Some performers prefer to place the yatga on two stands. The instrument will be placed in a position that the higher strings are on the right and front side, and all the strings will be plucked only on the right side of the bridges.

The pitch of a string can also be varied by moving the bridges. Because two notes are missing, there should be some space between the bridges of the E and G strings, and also some space between the A and C strings.

The instrument is tuned by mechanics hidden on the right side of the yatga. After basic tuning, the instrument is fine-tuned by moving the bridges to either side. The player can vary the pitch or a note by one half tone or more when pressing down on the strings to the left of the bridges.

Besides western style musical scores, a number-based notation is in use in China and other countries. The highest note string gets the number 1, and the following are numbered in an ascending order. The tune of string 1 should be D or Re if the CDEGA scheme is in use.

Usually the green strings are the A notes. It is also possible to tune the yatga in 7 notes per octave, or 7 notes and 3 half notes (diatonic scale). Some contemporary players yatga prefer to use an actual horsehair bow rather than a stick, believing the sound to be smoother. The instrument is used in court, aristocratic, and folk music, as well as in contemporary classical music and film scores.
