= Guzheng =

Chinese musical instrument

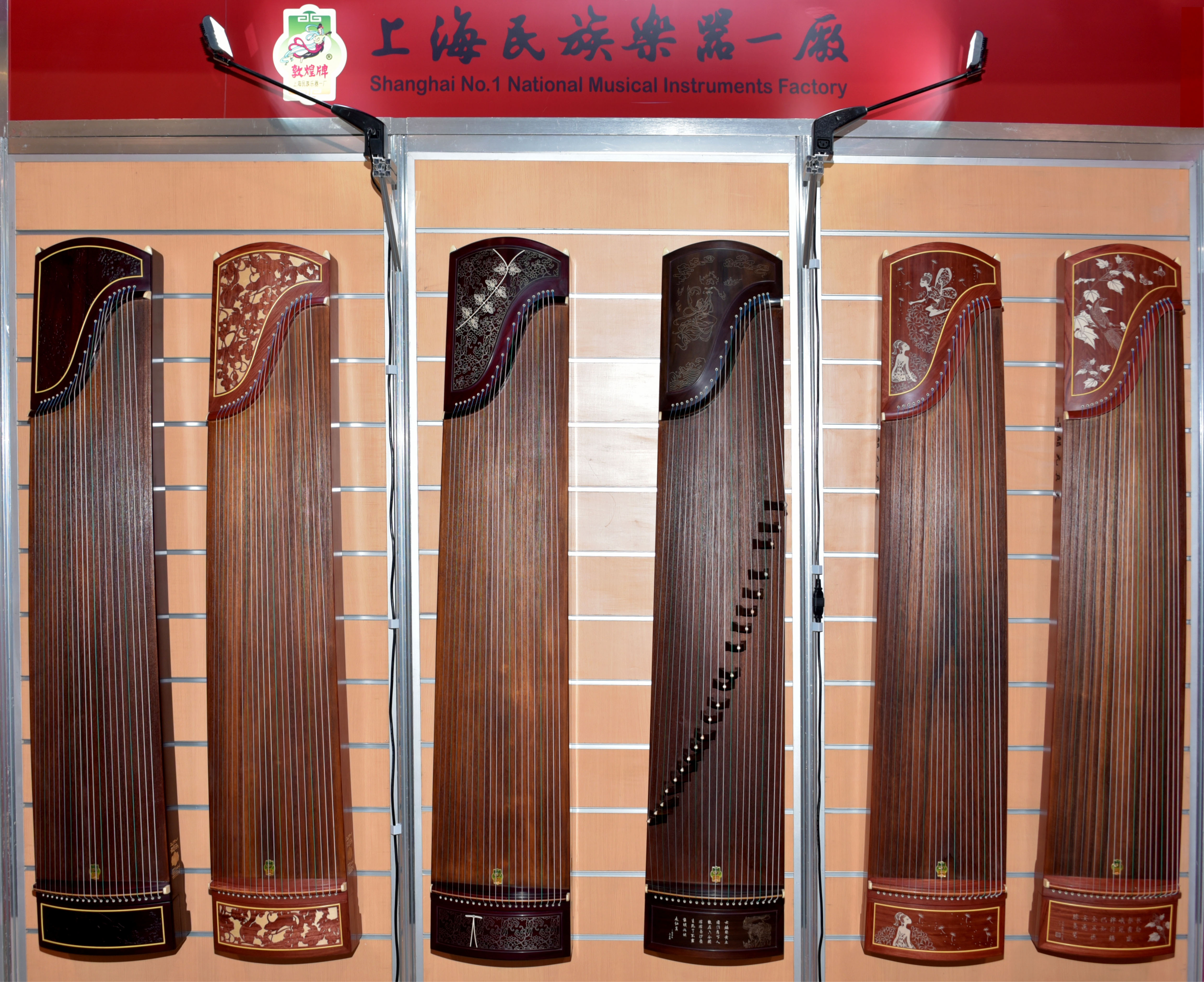
- Guzheng display at "The NAMM Show" 2020
- Traditional Chinese: 古箏
- Simplified Chinese: 古筝
- Literal meaning: Ancient Zheng
Transcriptions
Standard Mandarin
- Hanyu Pinyin: Gǔzhēng
- Wade–Giles: ku^{3}-cheng^{1}
- Yale Romanization: gǔ-jēng
- IPA: [kùʈʂə́ŋ]
Yue: Cantonese
- Yale Romanization: Gú-jāang
Southern Min
- Tâi-lô: Kóo-tsing

The zheng (pinyin: zhēng), or guzheng (Chinese: 古筝; pinyin: gǔzhēng; lit. 'ancient zheng'), is a Chinese plucked zither. The modern guzheng commonly has 21, 25, or 26 strings, is 64 inches (1.6 m; 5 ft 4 in) long, and is tuned in a major pentatonic scale. It has a large, resonant soundboard made from Paulownia wood (often times alluded in poetry with the tree's name or 桐 tóng). Other components are often made from other woods for structural or decorative reasons. Guzheng players often wear a fingerpick made from materials such as plastic, resin, tortoiseshell, or ivory on one or both hands.

It can have nylon, steel, or silk strings depending on the genre. The most common guzheng has 21 strings. The high-pitched strings of the guzheng are close to the player, and the low-pitched strings are on the opposite side. The strings' order from the inside to the outside is 1 to 21.

The guzheng is ancestral to several other Asian zithers such as the Japanese koto, the Korean gayageum and ajaeng, Mongolian yatga, the Vietnamese đàn tranh, The guzheng should not be confused with the guqin, a Chinese zither with seven strings played without moveable bridges.

The guzheng has undergone many changes during its long history. The oldest specimen yet discovered held 13 strings and was dated to possibly the Warring States period (475–221 BCE). The guzheng became prominent during the Qin dynasty (221–206 BCE). By the Tang Dynasty (618–907 CE), the guzheng was perhaps the most commonly played instrument in China. The guzheng is played throughout all of China with a variety of different techniques, depending on the region of China and the time period. It has a light timbre, broad range, rich performance skills, and strong expressive power, and it has been deeply loved by many Chinese people throughout history.

== Origin ==
The number of strings on the Guzheng has gradually increased over its 2,000 year history.

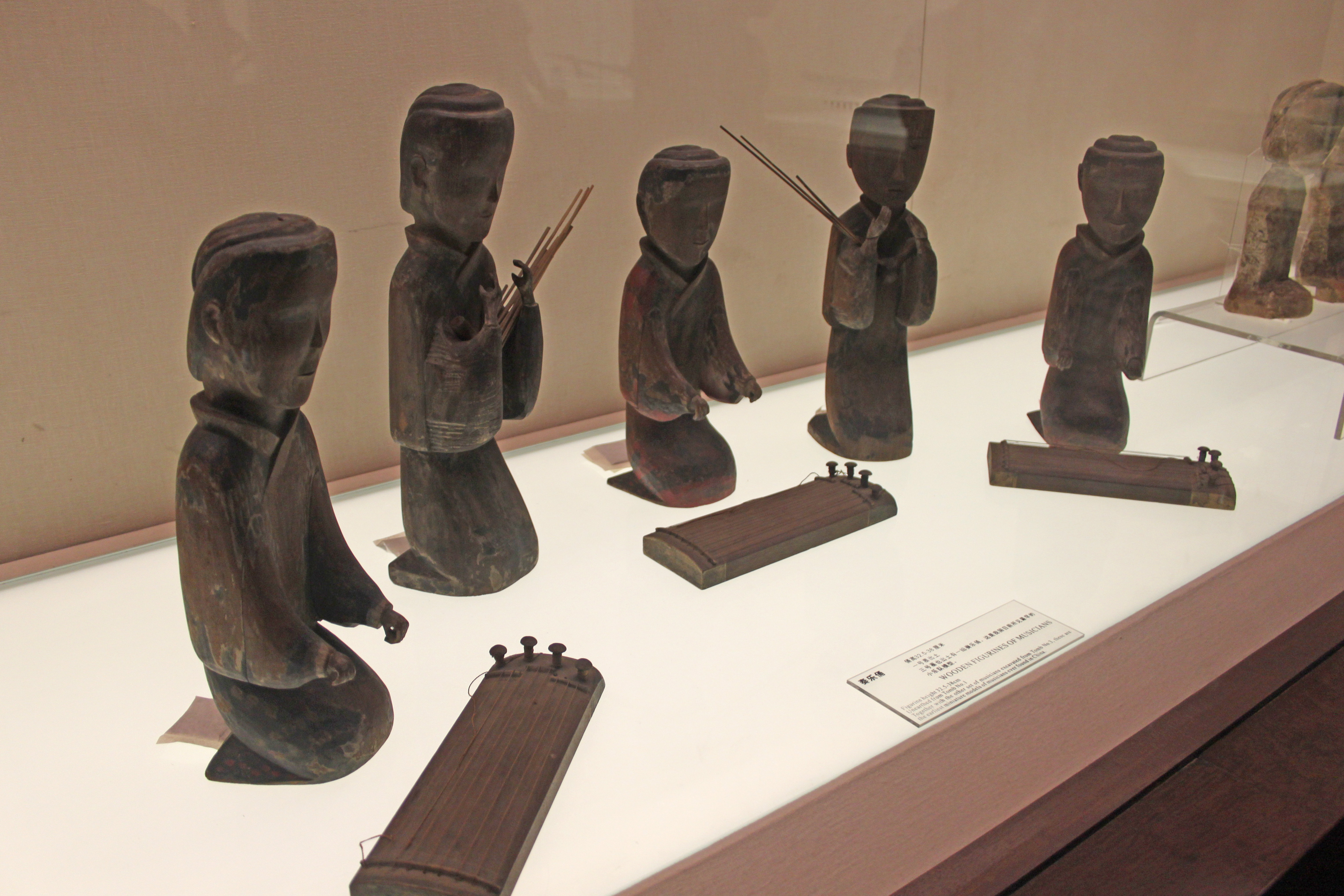
Ensemble of musician figurines, with three Se players; 2nd century BCE, from Mawangdui tomb

The guzheng has various accounts for its origin. An early guzheng-like instrument is said to have been invented by Meng Tian, a general of the Qin dynasty (221–206 BCE), largely influenced by the se. A second account says that the guzheng was originally developed as a bamboo-tube zither as recorded in the Shuowen Jiezi, which was later replaced by larger curved wooden boards with movable bridges to be more like the se. A third legend says the guzheng came about when two people fought over a 25-string se. They broke it in half, one person receiving a 12-string part and another the 13-string part.

Strings were once made of silk. During the Qing dynasty (1644–1912) the strings transitioned to only wires such as brass. Modern strings are almost always steel coated in nylon. First introduced in the 1970s, these multi-material strings increased the instrument's volume while maintaining an acceptable timbre.

The guzheng is often decorated. Artists create unique cultural and artistic content on the instrument. Decorations include carved art, carved lacquer, straw, mother-of-pearl inlays, painting, poetry, calligraphy, shell carving (jade), and cloisonné.

Guzheng music has similarity with folk songs, it is developed on the basis of people's life. Through the performance of performers, it reflects the production and life of people at that time.

== Styles and techniques ==
Strings of a typical guzheng tuned to C major

The guzheng is plucked by the fingers with or without plectra. Interestingly, among the 21 strings of Guzheng, although no strings are specifically assigned to play F or B, those pitches can be produced by pressing E and A instead, respectively. Most modern players use plectra that are attached to up to four fingers on each hand. Ancient picks were made of mundane materials such as bamboo, bone, and animal teeth or by finer materials such as ivory, tortoiseshell, and jade.

Traditional playing styles use the right hand to pluck notes and the left hand to add ornamentation such as pitch slides and vibrato by pressing the strings to the left of the movable bridges. Modern styles use both hands to play on the right side of the strings. There are many techniques used to strike notes. One iconic sound is a tremolo produced by the right thumb rotating rapidly around the same note. Other guzheng techniques include harmonics (Fanyin) where one plucks a string while tapping it at the same time, producing a note in a higher octave.

Many guzheng techniques have been borrowed from other instruments. For example, Lun is a borrowed technique. In Lun, all five fingers pluck on a string to produce a tremolo sound similar to the Pipa.

Techniques can also vary in Northern and Southern China, producing different sounds and styles.

=== Northern China ===
Northern styles include songs from the Shandong and Henan regional schools.

Songs from Shandong include "High Mountain and Flowing Water [Shandong Version]" (Gao Shan Liu Shui) and "Autumn Moon Over the Han Palace" (Han Gong Qiu Yue). Songs from Henan include "High Mountain and Flowing Water [Henan Version]" and "Going Upstairs" (Shang Lou).

According to Samuel Wong, songs from Henan are fiery. Left hand slides and vibrato are used frequently and tremolo is done with the thumb. Meanwhile, Shandong songs are "glamorous ... melodic lines often rise and fall dramatically ... Its music is characteristically light and refreshing.” Slide descending notes are not used as often as Henan. Glissandos are always on beat.

=== Southern China ===
Southern styles include Chaozhou and Kejia (Hakka) regional styles. Another prominent school is the Zhejiang regional school in the southeast.

Southern songs include "Jackdaw Plays with Water" (Han Ya Xi Shui) from Chaozhou and "Lotus Emerging from Water" (Chu Shui Lian) from the Hakka School. Famous songs from Zhejiang include "The General's Command" (Jiang Jun Ling).

Chaozhou and Hakka songs are similar but according to Mei Han, “Hakka melodies are similar to but less highly embellished than those of the neighboring Chaozhou school.” Songs from Chaozhou use even less descending notes and glissando are free rhythm. Chaozhou songs have "irregular beats, and alternate between hard and soft taps on the strings." Zhejiang songs use technique similar to the Pipa. Frequent tremolo is used with left-hand glissando. Other techniques include sidian, where 16th notes are played used thumb, index finger and middle finger in quick tempo.

The guzheng is played on a pentatonic scale, with notes "fa" and "ti" being produced by bending the strings. The scale can change with using "flat", "natural" and "sharp" notes. Chaozhou songs use multiple scales, using both "flat" notes or both "natural" notes. The tone of the song can change based on the scale.

=== Modern music ===
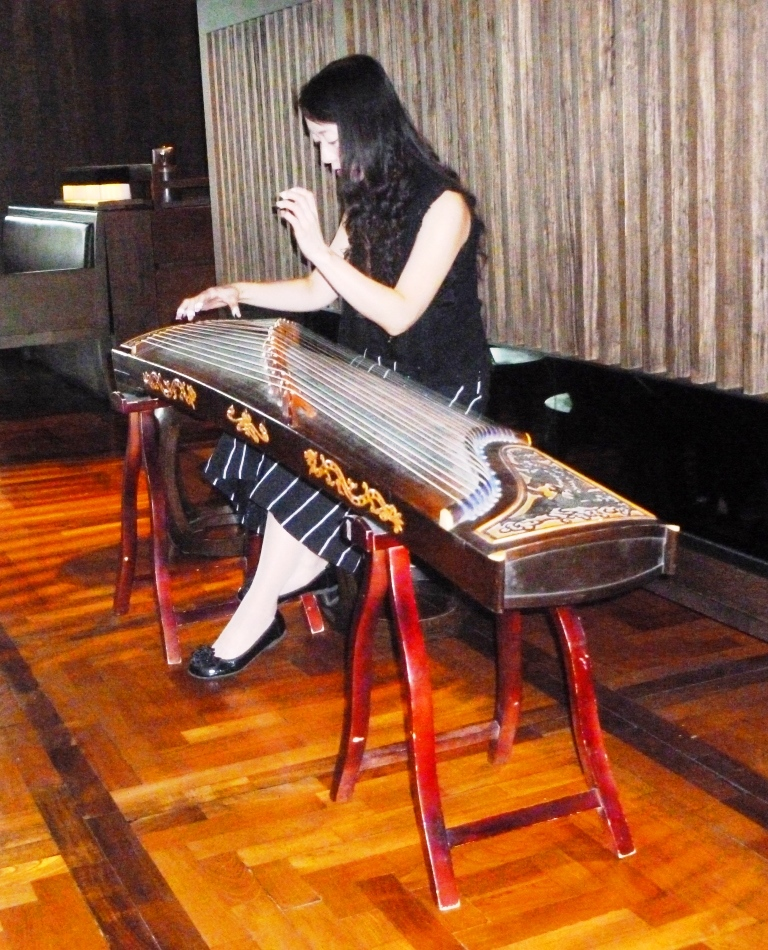
Woman playing guzheng in Taipei (2010).

Many pieces composed since the 1950s have used newer techniques and also mix elements from both northern and southern styles, ultimately creating a new modern school. Examples of modern songs include "Spring on Snowy Mountain" (Xue Shan Chun Xiao) by Fan Shang E, and "Fighting the Typhoon" (Zhan Tai Feng) by Wang Changyuan.

Newer techniques (especially since the 1950s) have included playing harmony and counterpoint with the left hand.

Experimental, atonal pieces have been composed since the 1980s. For example, "Ming Mountain" (Ming Shan) and "Gloomy Fragrance" (An Xiang) are contemporary songs that do not use the traditional pentatonic scale.

In 2021, Chinese/Australian guzheng composer and player Mindy Meng Wang collaborated with Australian electronic musician Tim Shiel, releasing a single, "Hidden Qi 隐.气", in February, followed by an EP, Nervous Energy 一 触即发, in March of that year. She has previously collaborated with British band Gorillaz and Australian band Regurgitator, and intends to stay in Australia and continue to produce modern music.

== Notable people ==
Notable 20th-century players and teachers include Wang Xunzhi (王巽之, 1899–1972), who popularized the Wulin zheng school based in Hangzhou, Zhejiang; Lou Shuhua, who rearranged a traditional guzheng piece and named it Yu Zhou Chang Wan; Liang Tsai-Ping (1911–2000), who edited the first guzheng manual (Nizheng Pu) in 1938; Cao Dongfu (1898–1970), from Henan; Gao Zicheng (born 1918) and Zhao Yuzhai (born 1924), who are both from Shandong; Su Wenxian (1907–1971); Guo Ying (born 1914) and Lin Maogen (born 1929), who are both from Chaozhou; the Hakka Luo Jiuxiang (1902–1978) and Cao Guifen and Cao Zheng (曹正, 1920–1998), who are both trained in the Henan school. The Cao family of Henan are known as masters of the guzheng.

Notable 21st-century Chinese guzheng players include Xiang Sihua, Wang Zhongshan, Chang Jing, Jing Xia, and Funa. Although most guzheng music is Chinese classical music, the American composer Lou Harrison (1917–2003) played and composed for the instrument. Contemporary guzheng works have also been written by non-Chinese composers such as Halim El-Dabh, Kevin Austin, David Vayo, Simon Steen-Andersen, and Jon Foreman.

Zhang Yan (张燕, 1945–1996) played the guzheng, performing and recording with Asian American jazz bandleader Jon Jang. Other musicians playing in non-traditional styles include Wu Fei, Xu Fengxia, Randy Raine-Reusch, Mei Han, Zi Lan Liao, Andreas Vollenweider, Jaron Lanier, Mike Hovancsek.

== In popular culture ==
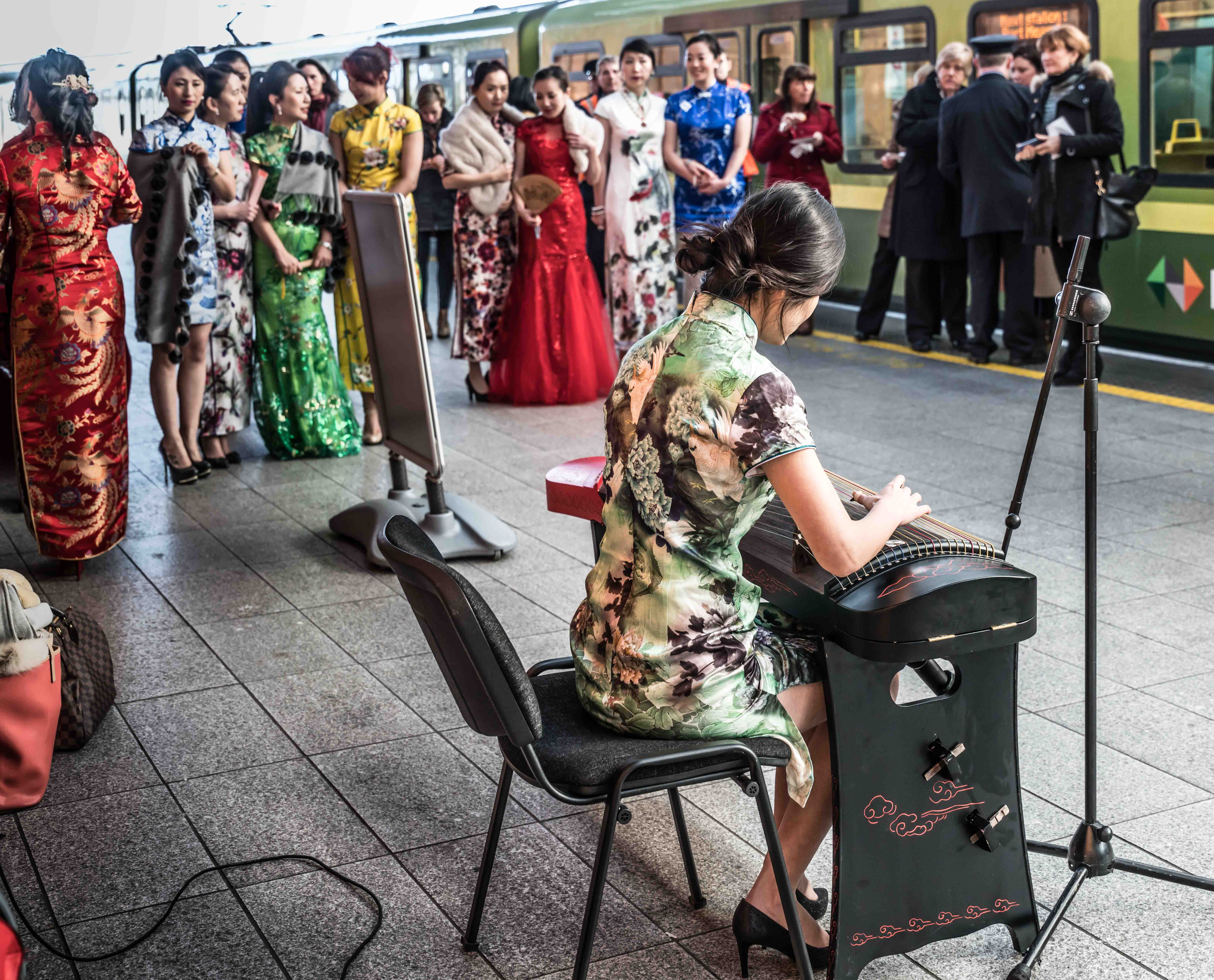
Guzheng in a Chinese New Year celebration (2016) in Dublin, Ireland

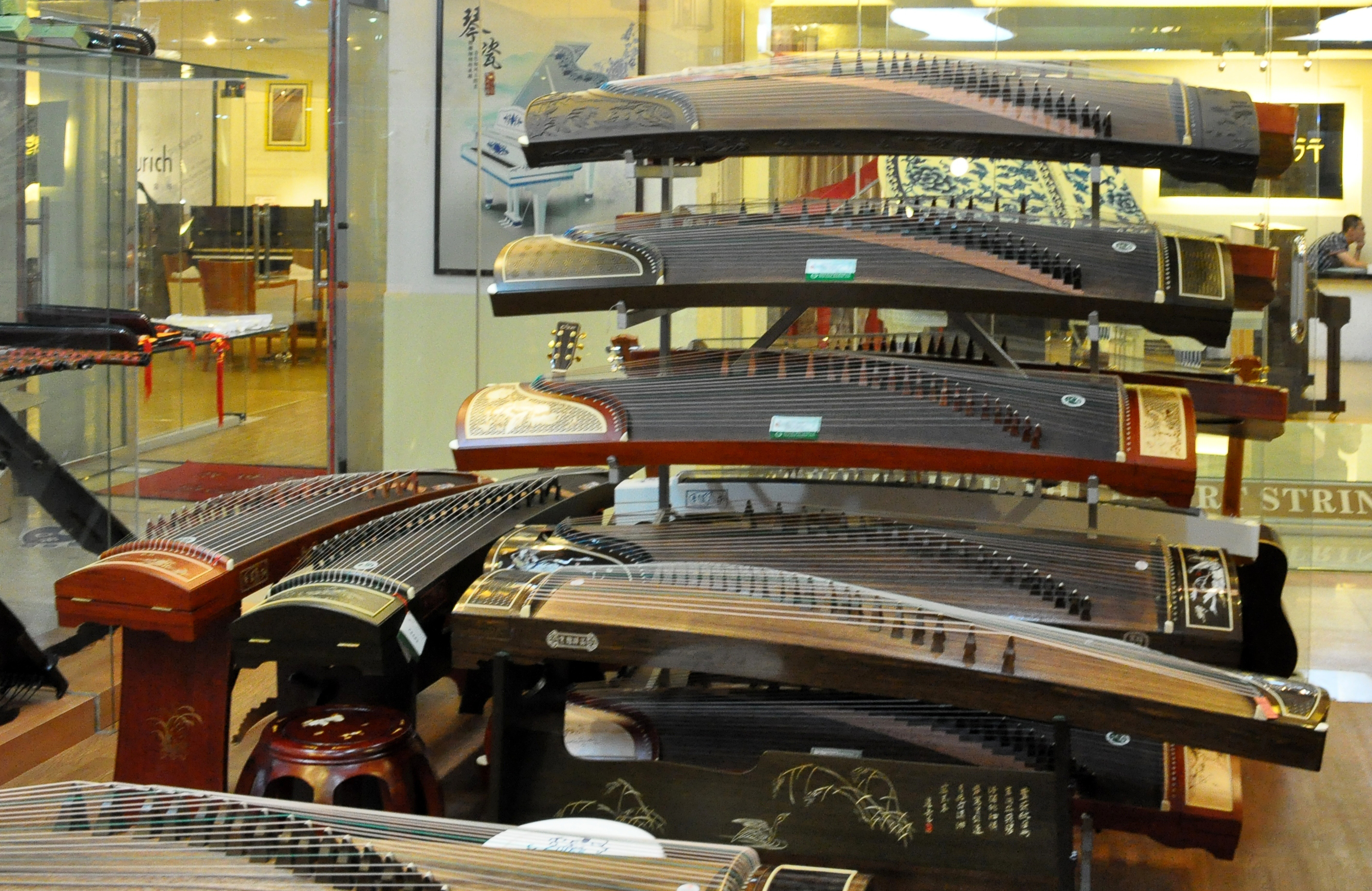
Chinese guzheng in a shop

In the television drama series My Fair Princess, actress Ruby Lin's character Xia Ziwei plays the guzheng (although she mimes to the music). It is featured in the 1980 pop hit, "Everybody's Got to Learn Sometime", by the Korgis.

In the film Kung Fu Hustle, the assassins known as The Harpists play a long zither to generate bladed and percussive attacks. The instrument has raised bridges like a guzheng but its body is shaped like a guqin. The sound is that of a guqin.

The guzheng has been used in rock music by Chinese performer Wang Yong of Cui Jian, the English musician Jakko Jakszyk (on the 2011 Jakszyk, Fripp & Collins album A Scarcity of Miracles), J.B. Brubaker of August Burns Red on "Creative Captivity" from the 2013 album Rescue & Restore, and the virtual band Gorillaz on "Hong Kong" (from the 2005 Help! A Day in the Life compilation). Jerusalem-based multi-instrumentalist Bradley Fish used the guzheng with a rock-influenced style and electronic effects on his 1996 collaboration "The Aquarium Conspiracy" (with Sugarcubes/Björk drummer Sigtryggur Baldursson), and is the most widely recorded artist of loops for the instrument. Mandopop singer-songwriter and music producer Lay Zhang is known for using traditional Chinese instruments such as the guzheng.

In the first book of the Remembrance of Earth's Past trilogy by Liu Cixin, a military operation which sets up thin strands of nanomaterial across the Panama Canal in order to slice the incoming ship Judgment Day into slivers as it travels through the canal is codenamed Guzheng, referencing the resemblance of the strands of nanomaterial across the canal to the strings of the instrument.

== See also ==
- Chadagan
- Đàn tranh
- Gayageum
- Kacapi
- Koto
- Se
- Yatga

== Bibliography ==
- Han Mei. "Zheng." In The New Grove Dictionary of Music and Musicians, second edition, edited by Stanley Sadie and John Tyrrell (Oxford, 2001).
- Dr Sun Zhuo (28 August 2015). The Chinese Zheng Zither: Contemporary Transformations. Ashgate Publishing, Ltd. pp. 253–. ISBN 978-1-4724-1667-4.
