= Se (instrument) =

Musical instrument

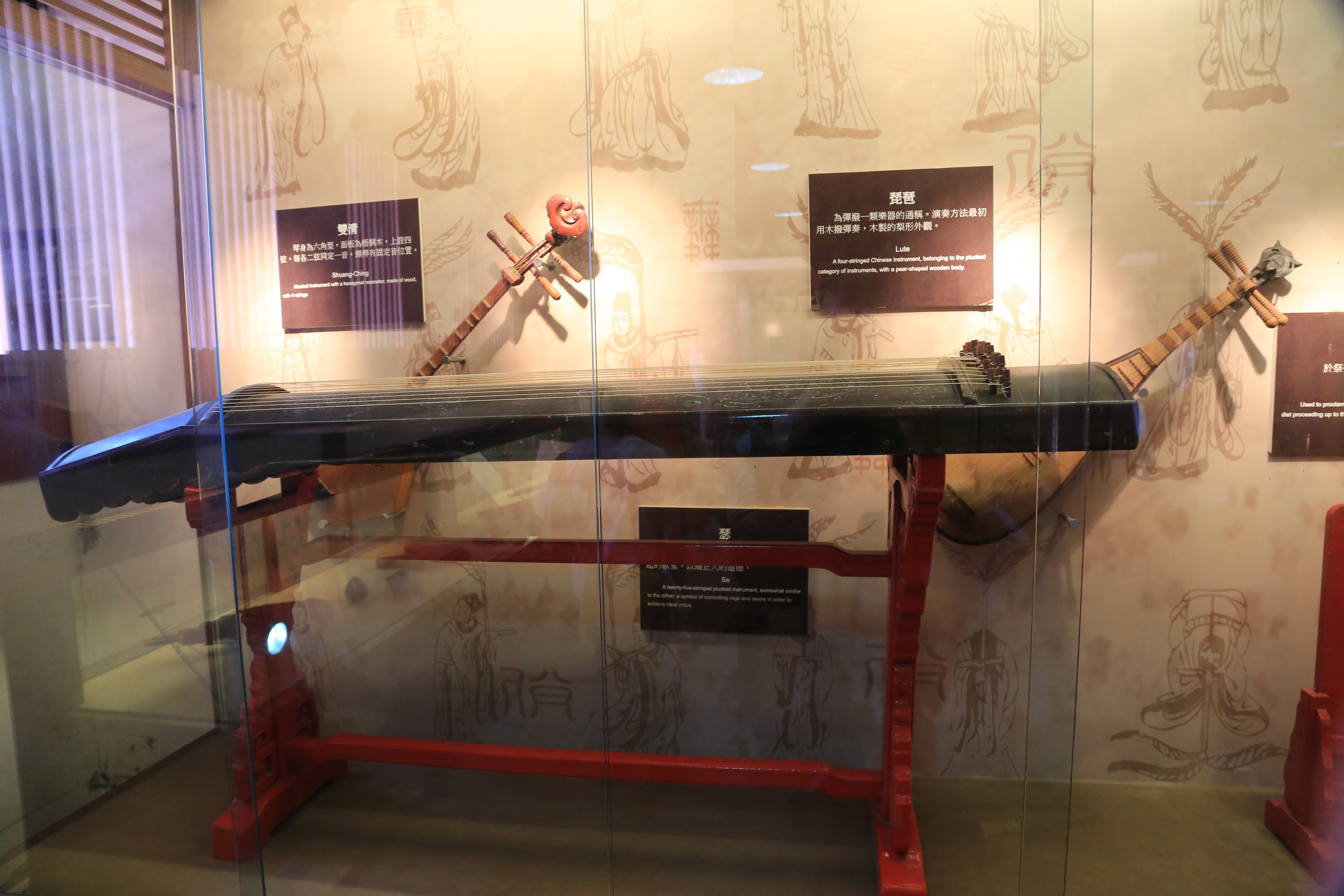
- A modern se on display at the Tainan Confucian Temple.
- Chinese: 瑟,古瑟
Transcriptions
Standard Mandarin
- Hanyu Pinyin: sè, gǔ sè
- Wade–Giles: se^{4}
- IPA: [sɤ̂]
Yue: Cantonese
- Yale Romanization: sāt
Southern Min
- Tâi-lô: sit
Middle Chinese
- Middle Chinese: ʂit
Old Chinese
- Baxter–Sagart (2014): *[s.m]ri[t]

The se (Chinese: 瑟) or guse (Chinese: 古瑟) is an ancient plucked zither of Chinese origin. It varied in size and construction, but generally had 25–50 strings with moveable bridges and a range of up to five octaves. It was one of the most important stringed instruments in China, along with the guqin. The se gradually faded out of use, with only occasional attempts to revive it, such as Xiong Penglai’s 熊朋來 (1246-1323) publication of the Se Manual (sepu 瑟譜). The se was ultimately replaced by the similar zheng; modern reconstructions of the se resemble the zheng.

== History ==
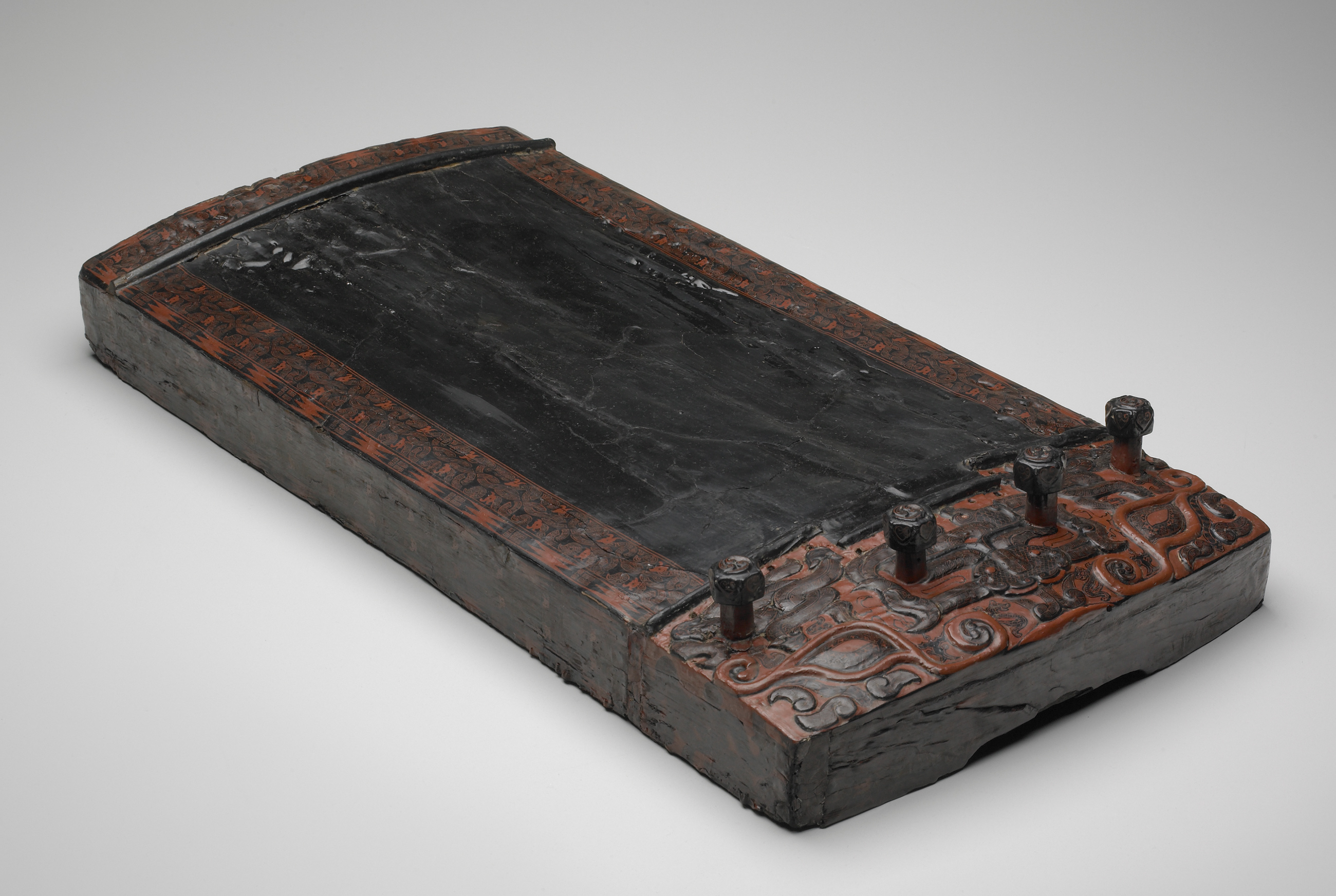
An ancient se board with four string posts, dated to the 5th–3rd centuries BC. The board is made of wood painted in black and red lacquer, and carved with decorative patterns. The strings no longer exist.

According to legend, the se was created by the god Fuxi. It is said that the word for music, yue (樂), is composed of the characters si for silk (絲) and mu for wood (木), and that it is a representation of the instrument.

Historical accounts of the se begin in the Western Zhou period (1045–771 BC), and was a popular instrument during the Spring and Autumn period (771–476 BC). Together with the qin, it is mentioned in the Guan Ju, the famous first poem from the Classic of Poetry (11th–7th centuries BC). The se is also mentioned in The Analects of Confucius (5th–3rd centuries BC). During the Zhou dynasty, the se was considered an instrument of elites, and was used to play ritualistic music for sacrificial offerings.

By the Warring States period (5th century BC), the se began developing into early forms of the zheng, another type of plucked zither. Thus, the zheng is sometimes considered to be a smaller and more simplified version of the se, with fewer strings. Se was very popular in the pre Qin dynasty and the Han dynasty.

=== Archaeology ===
Surviving specimens have been excavated from Hubei and Hunan provinces, as well as the Jiangnan region of China. The instrument has also been found at Jiangsu, Anhui, Shandong, and Liaoning. The Tomb of Marquis Yi of Zeng (late 5th century BC) in Hubei contained a wealth of musical instruments, including a se, a complete set of bianzhong (bronze bells), a guqin (plucked zither), stone chimes, and a drum.

The Institute of music of the Chinese Academy of Arts collects the se of the early Qing dynasty, 207 cm long and 43 cm wide.

The Shōsōin storehouse in Japan has one se in its inventory of historical instruments, mostly from the 8th century.

== Construction ==
Ancient se were built with a wooden sound board that curved slightly in the center, and had three bridges at the end, and one bridge at the head. Usually, four posts are built into one end to anchor the strings, although some instruments only had two or three posts. The board and posts are often lacquered, and carved with decorative motifs. The lower end of a se has a long, arch-shaped opening for the strings to pass through.

The strings were made of twisted silk in varying thicknesses. The Lüshi Chunqiu (3rd century BC) states that: "A five stringed se, then became a fifteen stringed se. When Shun came to power, he added eight strings, so it became twenty-three." Another view suggests that the se started out with 50 strings. The Shiban later changes it to 25. "A big se has 50 strings, a middle se has 25." It also says that Fuxi created the 50 stringed se, called a sha, whilst the Yellow Emperor reduced it to 25. There was also a "small se" that had half the strings (14). The number of strings and length of the instrument differs from place to place, with archaeological finds of examples with 25, 24, 23, or 19 strings. To string the instrument, one needs to tie a butterfly knot at the head of the string, strung through a bamboo rod, over the bridge at the head and over the main body of the instrument and over into the tail-end bridge into the instrument, out of the sound hole at the bottom of the instrument, over the tail-end, and wrapped around the posts in four or three groups.

Modern forms of the se generally do not have posts, and are instead strung a bit like the zheng, to which it resembles.

== Performance ==
There are very few modern players of the se, which largely became extinct in ancient times, although it is conceptually survived by the zheng. The only notable se player in the 20th century was Wu Jinglüe, who was primarily a guqin player. There are also very few surviving examples of musical tablature for the instrument, a majority existing in qinpu (tablature for the guqin) in which the se was used to provide accompaniment for the qin.

In recent times, there has been a revived interest in the se, with some musicians studying it. There are also a few factories that make modern se using nylon-wrapped metal strings, though the instrument needs to be properly researched using modern materials for it to be fully accepted as a playable instrument for general musical purposes. Sometimes electric guitar–style magnetic pickups are attached to a regular se, allowing the instrument to be amplified through an instrument amplifier or PA system.

== Similar instruments ==
In Korea, the instrument is called seul, and is still used in Confucian ritual music, which is performed twice per year at the Munmyo Shrine in Seoul. According to Akhak Gwebeom, the seul is the largest among string instruments and the string consists of 25 strings.

In Japan, the instrument is called shitsu, and was once used in gagaku music, but not in modern performances. A fourteen-stringed shitsu is used in mingaku music.

In Vietnam, the instrument is called sắt and is used in a limited context in ancient Chinese music.

== See also ==
- Traditional Chinese musical instruments
