= Elaha Soroor =

Afghan pop singer (born 1988)

Elaha Soroor الهه سرور
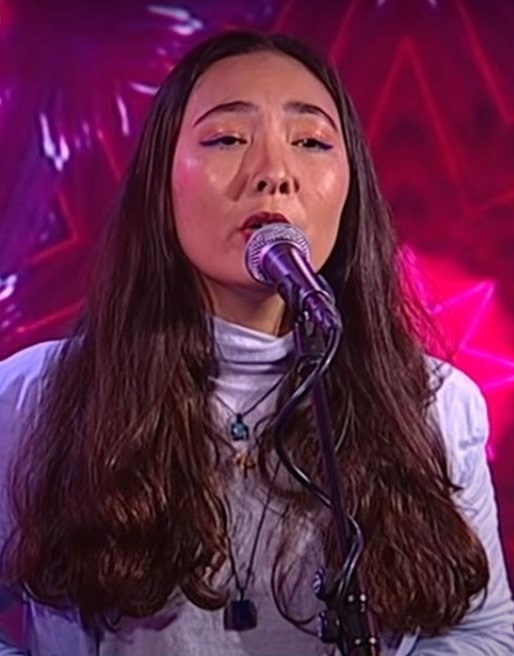
- Elaha Soroor, 7 October 2019

Background information
- Also known as: Elaha
- Born: Maryam; 1988 (age 37–38)
- Genres: pop
- Occupation: Singer
- Years active: 2008–present

Elaha Soroor (Dari/Hazaragi الهه سرور; born in 1988) is a singer and composer from Afghanistan. She participated in the musical reality show Afghan Star, a television program similar to the Idol franchise. She is a member of the Hazara ethnic group of Afghanistan, and a member of the band Kefaya.

== Personal life ==
Soroor was born in Iran into a religious family of refugees who left Afghanistan during the civil war, and lived there for 14 years. She and her family moved back to Afghanistan in 2005. During her high school years, Soroor worked as a news reporter for a local radio station in Kondoz, a city in the north of Afghanistan, she also worked for the Bakhtar news agency. At the same time, she taught literacy and maths to young girls and women from her neighborhood who were not allowed to attend school under Taliban law.

As a young woman in Kondoz (at the time, the Taliban still had influence on people of the area), Soroor was not afraid to openly challenge conservative views and fight for a more equal society. She was labeled by locals as a political activist, meaning she and her family were forced to leave Kondoz after receiving death threats from fundamentalist groups.

== Music career ==
After moving to Kabul with her family in 2007 Soroor began to develop her passion for music. She studied at music school where she specialized in traditional Afghan folk music whilst also studying western harmony, and started performing with Afghani group, Aryan. All this was done in secret without the consent or support of her family, who were against her performing as a professional musician. Upon finding out, they prevented her from singing for a year.

Soroor's voice was discovered by the judges of the TV talent show Afghan Star in 2009, where she gained popularity nationally among Afghan communities around the world.

Her first two original songs, "Abi Jan" and "Be Bahana" were released in 2009. In 2010 she recorded "Sangsar", a song which openly criticises the "stoning law" practiced by some Muslim communities.

She is part of the London-based ensamble Kefaya.

== Awards ==
On December 03, 2024, Elaha Soroor was included on the 2024's BBC's100 Women list for her inspiration and influence.

At a time when the voices of women in Afghanistan are being erased from public life, singer Elaha Soroor wrote the anthem Naan, Kar, Azadi! (Bread, Work, Freedom!) to counter this suppression and send a message of encouragement. The song premiered in October at the unprecedented All Afghan Women Summit in Albania.

== Discography ==
Live performances and concerts

- Concert in Copenhagen, Denmark (June 7, 2011)
- Concert in Nederland, Holland (June 2011)
- Special appearance on BBC New Year show of BBC Persian TV in 2013

Music videos

- "Bay Bahaana"
- "Abi Jan"
- "Devanegi"
- "Meyane Tariki"

with Kefaya

- Songs Of Our Mothers (2019, Bella Union)

== See also ==
- Afghan Star
- Shakeeb Hamdard
