= Maya Youssef =

Syrian Musician

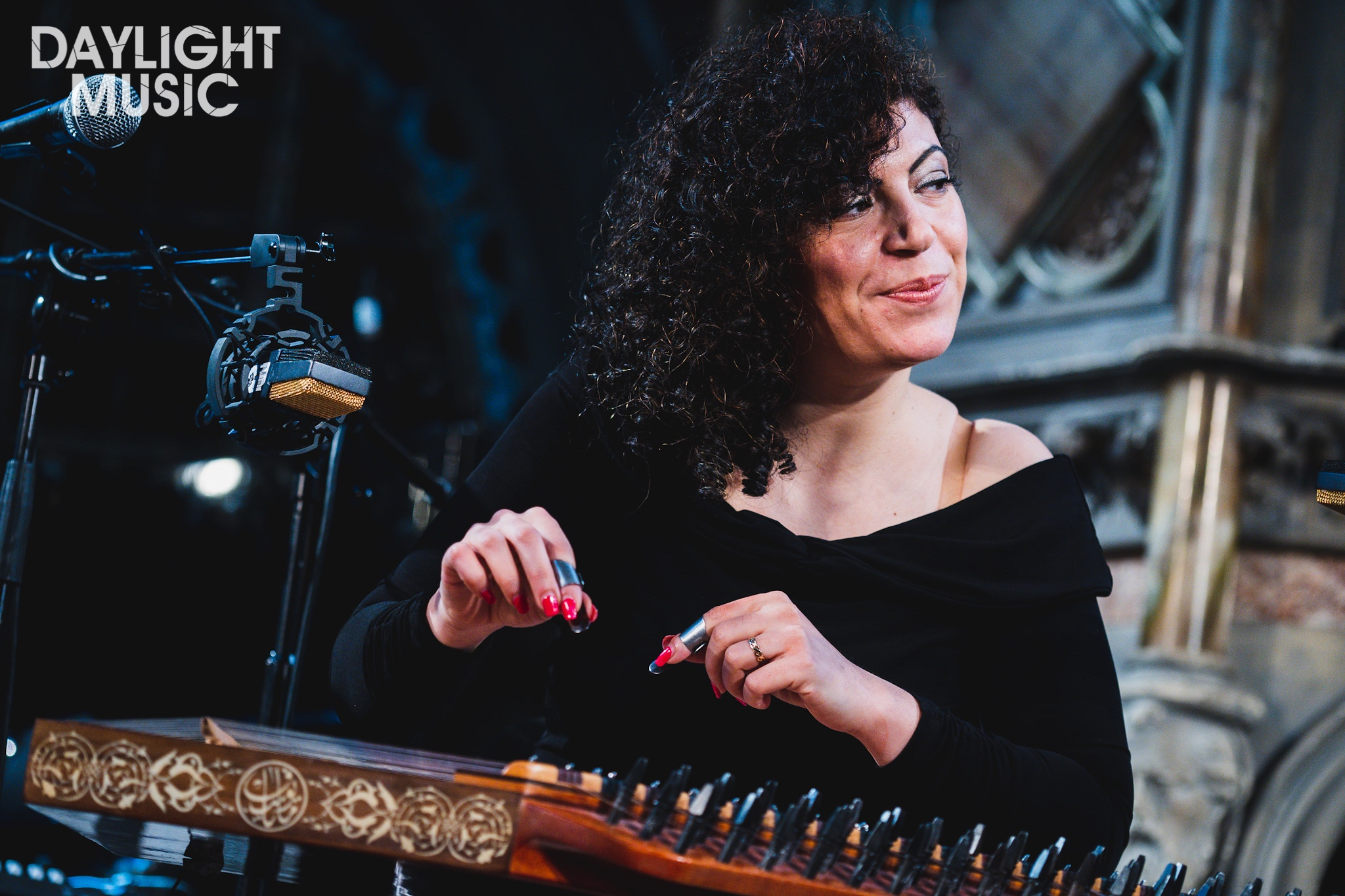

Background information
- Born: 1984 (age 41–42); Damascus, Syria
- Genres: Syrian music, Arabic music, jazz
- Occupations: Composer, musician, singer
- Instruments: qanun, violin
- Website: mayayoussef.com

Maya Youssef (born 1984) is a Syrian musician and composer based in the United Kingdom who plays the qanun. She has performed at the BBC Proms and WOMAD.

== Personal life and education ==
Maya Youssef was born in 1984 in Damascus, Syria, into a family of artists and writers. Her father is the writer and journalist Hassan M. Youssef, and her mother Rose Makhlouf is a translator.

At the age of seven she started to study music at the Sulhi al-Wadi Institute of Music in Damascus. Encouraged by her mother, the nine-year-old Maya chose the violin as her main instrument, before switching to the qanun.

At the age of 12, Youssef won the Best Musician Award in Syria's National Music Competition for Youth. She attended the Higher Institute of Music in Damascus, studying for a Bachelor of Arts degree in music and specializing on the qanun. At the same time she studied for a B.A. in English literature at the University of Damascus. Youssef was a founding member of the Syrian Female Oriental Band (SFOG) in 2003. She completed her degree in music in 2007 after studying with the Syrian composer and qanun player Salim Sarwa and Azerbaijani musician Elmira Akhundova. She also attended master classes by the Turkish qanun player Göksel Baktagir.

Youssef moved to Dubai in 2007 to focus on her solo career. In 2009 she was offered a post to teach the qanun and Arabic music at the Department of Music and Musicology at Sultan Qaboos University, Oman. Later, she has been living in the UK, having moved to London in 2012 under the Arts Council England’s Exceptional Talent scheme.

== Musical and academic career ==
In July 2014, Youssef appeared at the BBC Proms, playing as a solo artist and as part of an ensemble, with Kuljit Bhamra (tabla) and Adam Oscar Storey (double bass). At the end of 2016 she signed a contract with the independent record label Harmonia Mundi.

Her debut album Syrian Dreams was produced by Joe Boyd and released in November 2017 under the Harmonica Mundi label. As Youssef explained, "The main trigger that made me create Syrian Dreams was the Syrian war and the loss of my homeland. And it’s only by embarking on that spiritual journey of constant meditation and of finding home within God and within myself that I started to feel consolable and started to feel that I have my own home within me."

In 2018 she won the Newcomer Award This Week at the Songlines Music Awards in London. According to her website, she also has performed at WOMAD festival. In May 2019, she was invited by the British Council to play at the European Cultural Festival in Algiers.

As of 2021 Youssef is the Director of the School of Oriental and African Studies (SOAS) Middle Eastern Ensemble at the University of London. Her research at SOAS includes investigating how music can be used as a healing tool for children in Syrian refugee camps.

== Discography ==
- Syrian Dreams (November 2017)
- The Last Post (Soundtrack) (2017)
- Gold (Soundtrack) (2017)
- Finding home (2022)
