= Mozhdah Jamalzadah =

Afghan singer (born 1985)

- مژده جمالزاده
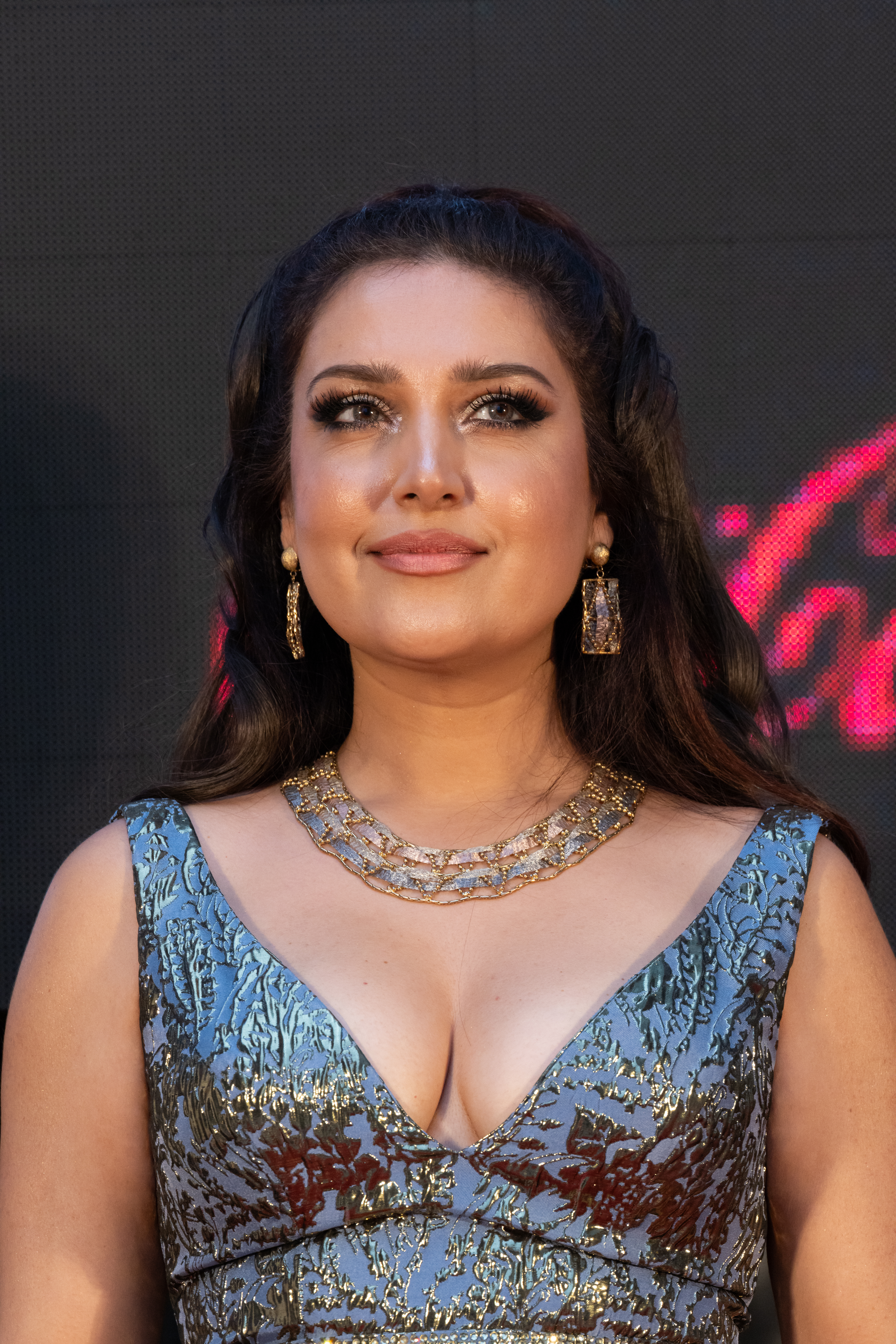
- Jamalzadah in 2024
- Born: December 7, 1985 (age 40); Kabul, Democratic Republic of Afghanistan
- Occupations: Singer; TV presenter; Actress
- Years active: 2007–present
- Musical career
- Genres: Pop music; Afghan folkloric music
- Instrument: Vocals
- Label: Ethnobeast

Mozhdah Jamalzadah (Dari: مژده جمالزاده; born December 7, 1985) is an Afghan Canadian singer, actress, model and activist. Jamalzadah formerly hosted The Mozhdah Show in Afghanistan, which discussed social issues such as women's rights.

== Early life ==
Mozhdah Jamalzadah was born on in Kabul to Bashir and Nasrin, in a family of Afghan Tajik descent. During the civil war in Afghanistan, Jamalzadah's family fled the country to neighbouring Pakistan; Jamalzadah was five years old at the time. The family later moved and resettled in Canada. She was raised in Vancouver, British Columbia, where she went on to study broadcast journalism at the British Columbia Institute of Technology, philosophy and political science at the University of British Columbia.

== Music career ==
Jamalzadah began writing songs in the early 2000s. Her debut song at the end of 2007 was "(Sher) Bacha e Afghani". Jamalzadah was a contestant on the sixth season of Canadian Idol performing "Say It Right", eliminated at the audition stage.

Afterwards she released "Dokhtare Afghan" (Afghan Girl), which became instantly popular on Afghan TV stations and airwaves. The song called attention to past stories of strong female Afghan heroines, and earned Jamalzadah nominations and awards at the Afghan and International TV and radio stations. The song was written by her father, who Mozhdah has called a feminist.

Don't break my wings, don't break my honor. I'm a proud Afghan girl.

As a result of her fame, in December 2009, she was offered the position to work with an up-and-coming television station in Afghanistan, 1TV, later earning her international attention. She was additionally the first woman to perform in the Islamic Republic of Afghanistan without a hijab.

Her debut album, Act One, containing the previously mentioned songs and others, was released in 2009.

On International Women's Day 2010, Mozhdah was asked to be the first Afghan to perform at the White House for the President, Barack Obama and First Lady Mrs. Obama, singing "Watan", a song describing the bravery of the country.

She was a presenter of Afghan Star from 2012 to 2013.

== The Mozhdah Show ==
Mozhdah's political and philosophical studies gave her the drive to pursue more difficult ambitions. Once she joined 1TV, she decided she wanted to make her trip to Afghanistan fulfill her desire to make a difference. She became the host of "The Mozhdah Show" which later became the subject of international media. The concept of The Mozhdah Show was created after The Oprah Winfrey Show, which gave Jamalzadah the title "Oprah of Afghanistan" by western media such as CNN and Time magazine.

On the Mozhdah Show, Jamalzadah and her producers created programming that addressed taboo topics in Afghan society, describing what it was like to be a woman, a child, and a person living in Afghan society. The Mozhdah Show also provided Mozhdah with the ability to explore and learn more about the current situation in Afghanistan through the eyes of Afghans.

== Other ventures ==
Jamalzadah has also worked as a model for Cosmopolitan and Asian Woman Magazine.

In 2018, Jamalzadah was a panellist on Canada Reads.

In 2019, she had an acting role in the drama film Red Snow by Marie Clements. That same year she was the subject of a biography published by Greystone Books, entitled Voice of Rebellion. The book was written by Roberta Staley. The cover was photographed by mixed-media artist HAUI and has featured prominently globally most notably in the UK edition of Harper's Bazaar.

== Personal life ==
Jamalzadah is a self-proclaimed "nerd" and introvert, and has been the owner of a cat.

== Awards ==
- Excellence in the Arts CCLA Gala 2012 Toronto, Ontario, Canada (for outstanding commitment and contribution to a rich, diverse and dynamic Canada)
- Best Light Song of the Year ATN Awards (2010)
- Best Female Artist ATN Awards (2012)
