= Okan Ersan =

Turkish-Cypriot musician (born 1972)

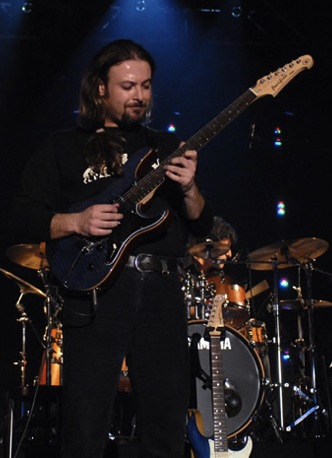

Background information
- Born: 27 April 1972 (age 54); Nicosia, Cyprus
- Genres: Jazz, jazz fusion, world fusion
- Occupations: Musician, songwriter, recording artist
- Years active: 1999–present
- Website: okanersan.com

Okan Ersan (born 27 April 1972) is a Turkish Cypriot jazz fusion guitarist, composer and record artist.

== Career ==
Okan Ersan was born in 1972 in Cyprus. Ersan, whose father was a musician, started to play guitar and piano at a very young age. He achieved his degree in music in 1994 and specialized as a guitar player in Istanbul, Music Academy at Marmara University. Throughout his academic education Ersan was very much influenced by Steve Lukather, Mike Stern, Frank Gambale, Al Di Meola, Robben Ford, Scott Henderson, Ritchie Blackmore and many other Classic, Jazz, Classic Rock, Fusion, Blues musicians which provoked him to create his own style which is today based on jazz fusion.

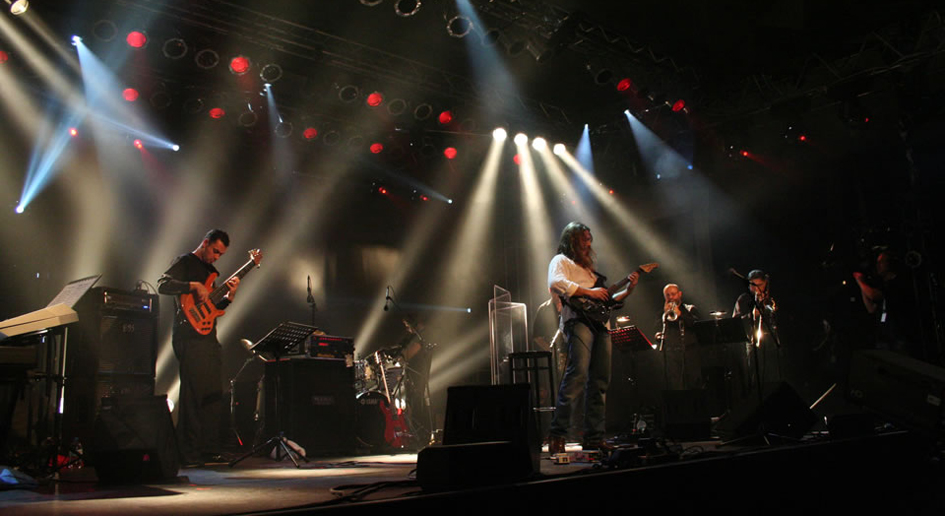
Okan Ersan performing at Leverkusener Jazztage

Okan Ersan started his musical journey in North Cyprus and carried his music to Turkey, Germany, the United States and the United Kingdom and began working as a composer. '’To whom it may concern'’ is the title song of first album and led him to take his place among the best five guitarists of the year 2003 with the British magazine Guitarist. In 2005 he signed a contract with a Record Company and was invited to the USA for a promotion tour. On tour he was invited as a guest guitarist to the Kansas City Jazz Festival and performed with Grammy awarded musician Billy Paul. In the same year Okan Ersan traveled abroad for workshops along with performances and concentrated on his own concerts as well as the presentation of his album.

In 2006, Ersan was invited to play as Al Di Meola's Supporting Band at the Leverkusener Jazztage. In 2007 he was asked to play two years in a row at the Leverkusener Jazztage in the Guitar Masters category with Robben Ford.

In 2008 Ersan staged with Panzerballett fusion Band supporting Chick Corea and John McLaughlin. In addition Okan played with Dave Weckl and Rex Richardson at the Yamaha All Stars Vol. 1 and Vol. 2 in 2008 November and December. In 2011 Okan Ersan released his new jazz fusion album A Reborn Journey. People who took part in this project included Dave Weckl, Ernie Watts, Ola Onabule, Misirli Ahmet, Ercan Irmak and Istanbul Superband.

In 2013 Okan Ersan performed a series of concerts with legendary vocalist Joe Lynn Turner of Rainbow, Deep Purple and Yngwie Malmsteen.

Recently, performed guitar recording sessions of Fazıl Say's latest album Yeni Şarkılar (The New Songs) for the song called "Ey Kör", which is a Ruba'i of Persian poet Omar Khayyam.

== Discography ==
- To Whom It May Concern (2005)
- A Reborn Journey (2011)
- Nibiru (2019)

== Equipment ==
Okan Ersan has an endorsement with Yamaha. He uses and owns the following guitar models; Pacifica 812v, Pacifica 904, AES-FG, SA2200, SG2000'. He is also the player of PRS Guitars and uses ATC Acoustic Engineers.
