= Aytaç Doğan =

Turkish kanun player

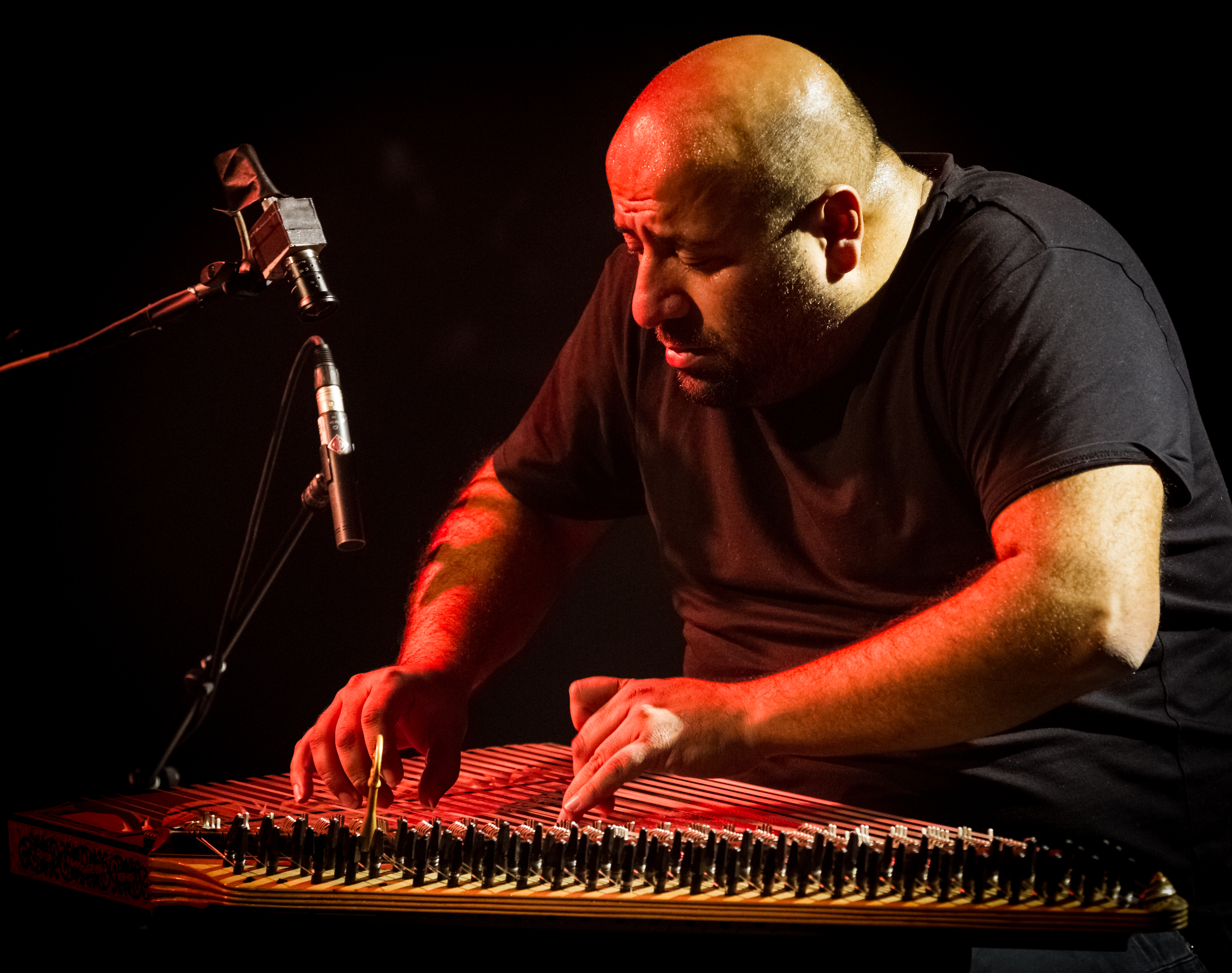

Background information
- Born: January 6, 1976 (age 50)
- Origin: Bursa, Turkey
- Genres: Arabesque, Jazz
- Instrument: Kanun
- Years active: 1981–present
- Member of: Taksim Trio

Aytaç Doğan (born January 6, 1976, in Bursa) is a Turkish kanun player. He is considered one of Turkey's most important kanun virtuosos.

== Biography ==
Born in Bursa on January 6, 1976, Aytaç Doğan was introduced to the kanun by his grandfather at age 13. After a year of lessons, he impressed İbrahim Tatlıses while Tatlıses was shooting a film at the estate of Doğan's great-uncle in Bursa. Tatlıses brought Doğan to begin performing with him the same evening. The same year, Doğan was married and became a father one year later at age 15.

He continued working with Tatlıses in his orchestra for a few years before moving to Istanbul, where he recorded albums for various popular Turkish artists. Doğan became notable for his unique style and single plectrum technique. He was introduced to several other kanun players in Cairo by Mısırlı Ahmet after Ahmed heard a tape of Doğan's music during a trip to Germany. Shortly thereafter, he met bağlama player İsmail Tunçbilek, with whom he would continue to collaborate. In 2007, the two formed the Taksim Trio alongside clarinet player Hüsnü Şenlendirici.

In 2013, his first solo album was released.
