= Songlines (magazine) =

British music magazine

- Songlines Music Awards 2010 issue
- Editor: Russ Slater Johnson
- Founding Editor: Simon Broughton
- Frequency: 10 times a year
- Circulation: 20,000
- Founded: 1999
- Company: Mark Allen Group
- Country: United Kingdom
- Language: English
- Website: www.songlines.co.uk

Songlines is a British magazine launched in 1999 that covers music from traditional and popular to contemporary and fusion, featuring artists from around the globe.

Songlines is published 10 times a year and contains album reviews, artist interviews, guides to particular world music traditions, concert and festival listings and travel stories. Every issue comes with an accompanying compilation CD featuring sample tracks from 10 of the best new releases reviewed in that issue and five additional tracks.

The founding editor is Simon Broughton, co-editor of The Rough Guide to World Music. It is now edited by Russ Slater Johnson.

The name was chosen based on the aboriginal mythological concept of songlines.

== History ==
In 2008 Songlines was expanded to include Songlines Music Travel, a music tourism service offering excursions to renowned world music locations and festivals. This is now on indefinite hiatus.

In 2009 Songlines launched Songlines Digital, an online subscription version of the magazine.

Mark Allen Group acquired Songlines in 2015.

== Songlines Music Awards ==
In 2009, Songlines launched their Music Awards to replace the cancelled BBC Radio 3 Awards for World Music World Music Awards. The Songlines award is granted in four categories: Best Artist, Best Group, Best Cross-Cultural Collaboration and Best Newcomer.

Year	Best Artist	Best Group	Best Cross-Cultural Collaboration	Best Newcomer
2009	Rokia Traoré	Amadou & Mariam	Jah Wobble & The Chinese Dub Orchestra	Kiran Ahluwalia
2010	Goran Bregović	Staff Benda Bilili	Justin Adams & Juldeh Camara	Deolinda
2011	Femi Kuti	Bellowhead	AfroCubism	Raghu Dixit
2012	Anoushka Shankar	Tinariwen	Yo Yo Ma featuring Stuart Duncan, Edgar Meyer and Chris Thile	Fatoumata Diawara
2013	Angélique Kidjo	Lo'Jo	Dub Colossus	Mokoomba
2014	Bassekou Kouyate	Tamikrest	Catrin Finch & Seckou Keita	Family Atlantica
2015	Tony Allen	Toumani & Sidiki Diabaté	Kronos Quartet	Ibibio Sound Machine
2016	Mariza	Africa Express	-	Songhoy Blues
2017	Baaba Maal	Afro Celt Sound System	-	Kefaya
2018	Oumou Sangaré	Canzoniere Grecanico Salentino	-	Maya Youssef
2019	Gaye Su Akyol	Monsieur Doumani	-	Anandi Bhattacharya
2020	Bassekou Koyaté	Cimarrón	-	Kefaya+Elaha Soroor
2021	Liraz	Ayom		Alostmen
2022	Samba Touré	Tirana-Tirona Allstars		Balimaya Project
2023	Oumou Sangaré	Divanhana		Jasdeep Singh Degun
2024	Badiâa Bouhrizi	Mostar Sevdah Reunion	Kayhan Kalhor & Toumani Diabaté	Bala Desejo

Instead of the category Best Cross-Cultural Collaboration, the Songlines award was granted in 2016 in six new categories: Africa & Middle East, Americas, Asia & South Pacific, Europe, Fusion and World Pioneer Award. The winners were: Seckou Keita, Lila Downs, Debashish Bhattacharya, Sam Lee & Friends, Ballaké Sissoko & Vincent Ségal and Chris Blackwell.

== See also ==
- Awards for world music
