= Zahra Elham =

Afghan singer

Zahra Elham زهرا الهام
- Born: Zahra Elham; 2002 (age 22–23); Ghazni Province
- Origin: Afghanistan
- Genres: Folk
- Occupation: Singer
- Instrument: Dombura
- Years active: 2018–present

Zahra Elham (Persian: زهرا الهام; born c. 2002) is an Afghan singer best known for being the first female winner of the reality singing competition Afghan Star. Elham, belonging to the Hazara people group, has continued her music career since receiving asylum in Australia following the 2021 Taliban takeover of Afghanistan.

== Early life ==
Elham was born in Ghazni, Ghazni Province, Afghanistan. She is a member of Hazara ethnic group . Elham was inspired to become a singer after watching YouTube videos of Afghan pop singer Aryana Sayeed, in addition to watching Afghan Star growing up. Elham's parents were supportive of her dreams to become a musician.

== Career ==
Elham's musical career began in 2018 when she featured as a contestant in the fourteenth series of Afghan Star. Elham and her childhood friend Sediqa Madadgar were the only two female contestants to qualify for the live shows; their time in the competition was subsequently featured in the 2022 documentary And Still I Sing. While on the show, Elham was noted for her high-pitched singing voice and for performing traditional Hazaragi songs. In 2019, she became only the second female contestant to reach the final of a series of Afghan Star, following Zulala Hashemi in 2017; Hashemi had ultimately finished as runner up to Sayid Jamal Mubariz. During her time on the show, Elham spoke out against conservative voices criticising her and Madadgar's appearances on the show, and stated her desire to break the pattern of Afghan Star winners being men. A statement Elham made mentioning her intention to "make the hearts of jealous men burst" went viral on social media, and was both praised and criticised in local media. In the final, Elham defeated Wasim Anwari to become the first female winner of Afghan Star. In her victory speech, she said "today, I represent all the girls of Afghanistan. Today, not only Zahra Elham, but all the girls in Afghanistan, have won".

Following her win, Elham performed at the Dambora festival in Bamyan, performing traditional Hazaragi songs, and released several singles on YouTube, including "Qataghani Song", "Yallah Yallah", and "Shaad Kon". Elham's career was halted after she fled Afghanistan a few days prior to the fall of Kabul in August 2021; she crossed a land border into Pakistan disguised in a burqa to join her family, who were already living as refugees in the country. In 2022, Elham was granted asylum in Australia, and currently lives in Melbourne, where she restarted her career, releasing the single "Malistani Song" that same year. In 2023, Elham announced she would be taking part in a tour of Australia and New Zealand with fellow Afghan folk singer Hamid Sakhizada.

Elham has cited her musical influences as being Justin Bieber, Selena Gomez, Aryana Sayeed, Shreya Ghoshal, and Arijit Singh.

== Media ==
Elham is predominantly featured in the 2022 documentary And Still I Sing, alongside fellow female Afghan Star contestant Sediqa Madadgar and female judge Aryana Sayeed, who also mentored Elham and Madadgar. The documentary aired at several film festivals, including the Hot Springs Documentary Film Festival and the Sydney Film Festival.
