= Laleh Osmany =

Afghan women's rights activist

Lalah Osmany
- لاله عثمانی
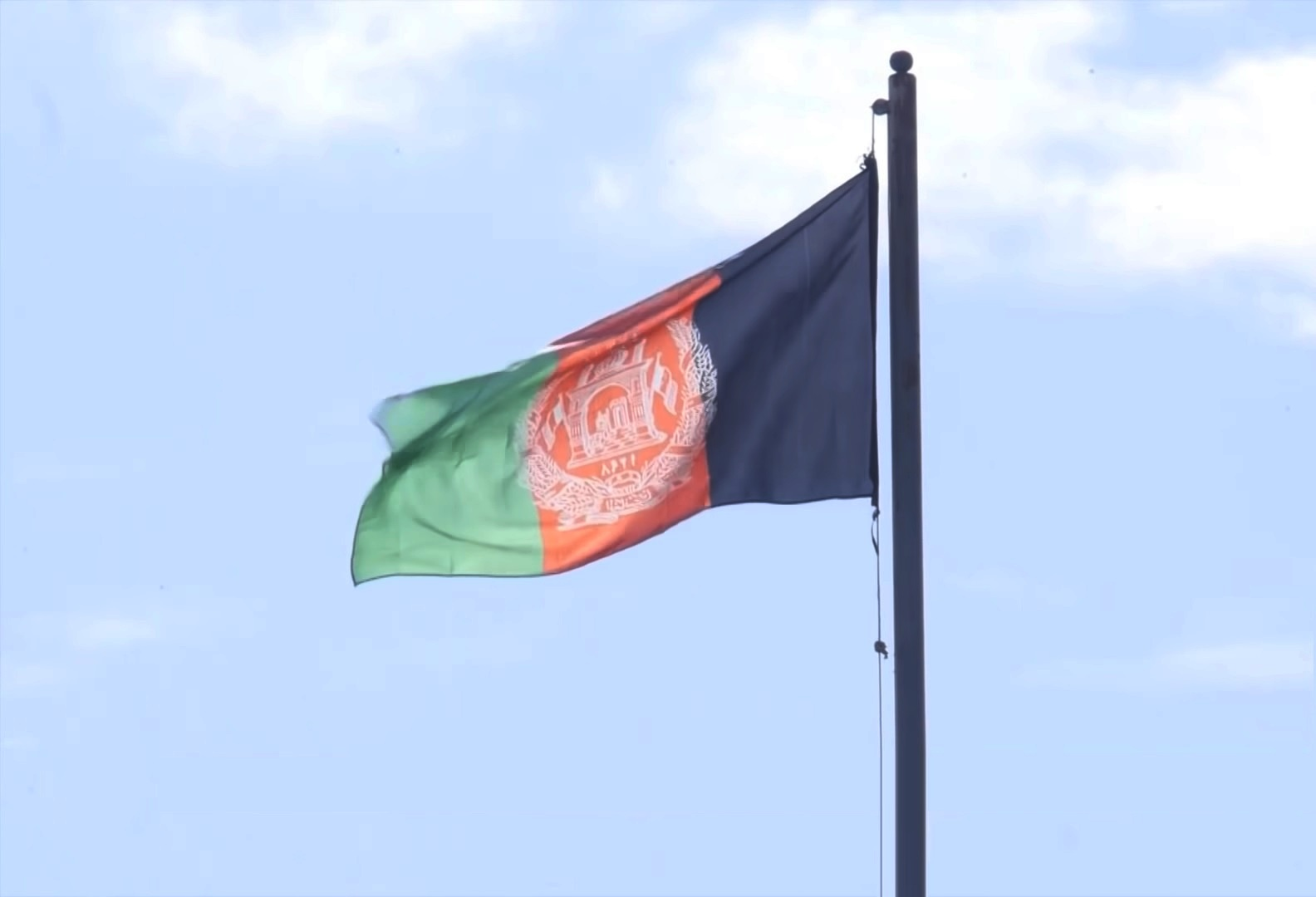
- Born: 1992 (age 33–34); Afghanistan
- Citizenship: Afghanistan, Germany
- Education: Herat University
- Occupations: Women's rights activist; lawyer
- Known for: "#WhereIsMyName" social media campaign

Lalah Osmany (Pashto: لاله عثمانی; born 1992) is a women's rights activist from Afghanistan, who founded the social media campaign #WhereIsMyName, which opposes the tradition that women's names were not used publicly in Afghanistan. For her work she was recognised among the BBC's 100 Women in 2020.

== Biography ==
Osmany was born in 1992 in Afghanistan; she later studied Islamic Law at Herat University. In 2017 she co-founded the #WhereIsMyName social media campaign with Tahmineh Rashiq. The campaign was set up in protest against the fact that in Afghanistan, women traditionally had no right for their names to be used in public. This custom meant that women's names did not appear on official documents such as birth or death certificates, and not even on her tombstone.

Mary Akrami, the chair of the Afghanistan's Women Network, described the news of the change in the law as a “positive step toward establishing women’s identity". Fawzia Koofi, an Afghan former MP and women's rights activist, said that the change was "not a matter of women's rights – it's a legal right, a human right". Other supporters of Osmany's work include Farhad Darya, the singer-songwriter Aryana Sayeed, and the MP Maryam Sama.

However the change in law was not welcomed by some, who see it as disrespectful to Afghan values or an action taken to appease the USA. The Taliban, who is 2020 were in talks with the Afghan government about power-sharing, oppose the inclusion of women's names on identity cards. In addition, Osmany has received threats of violence because of her role in the campaign.

Osmany's contributions to women's rights in Afghanistan were acknowledged when she featured on the BBC's 100 Women list published in 2020.
