= Omid Nezami =

- امید نظامی
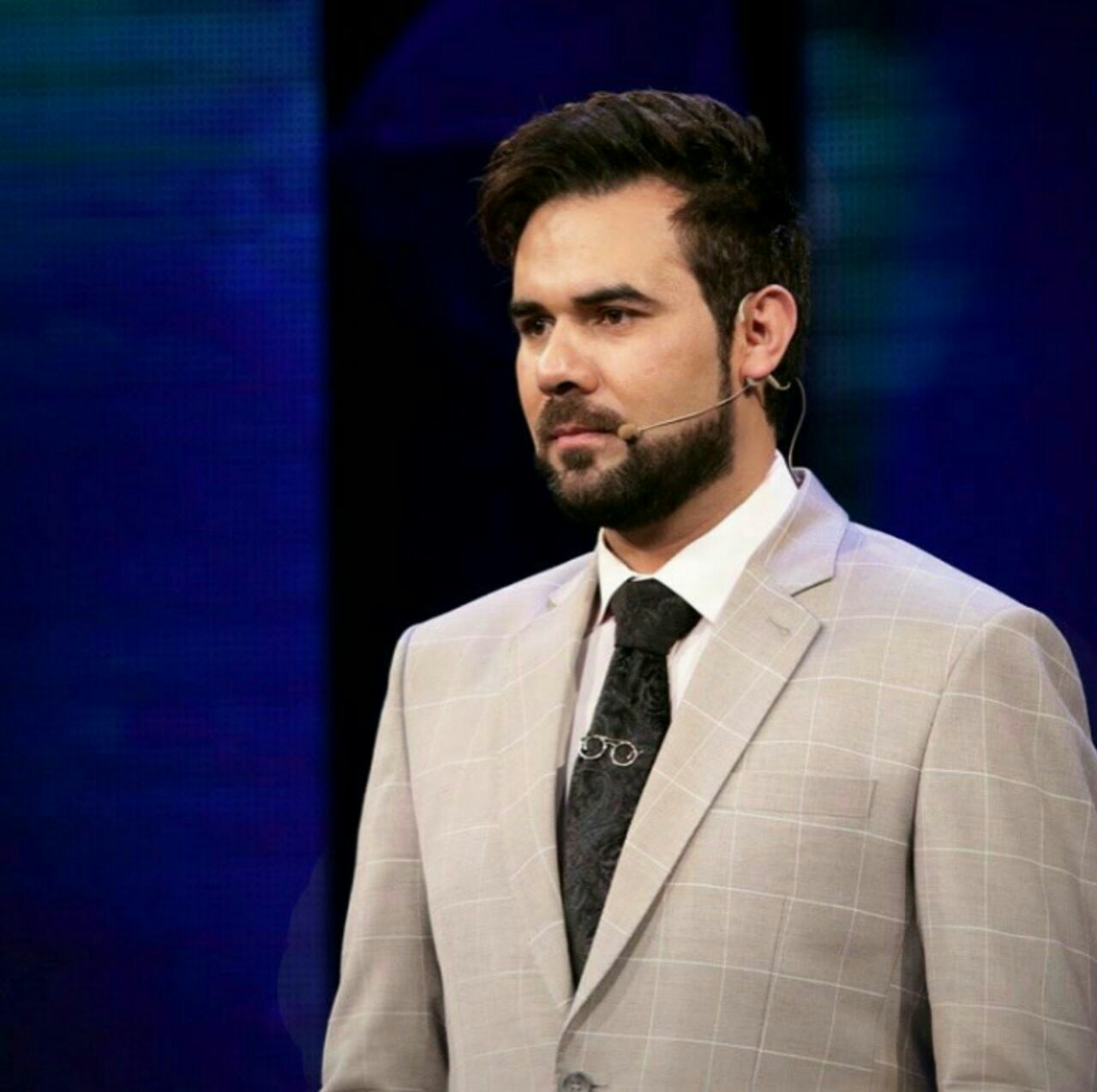
- Born: October 7, 1984 (age 41); Kabul, Afghanistan
- Occupations: Singer, tv presenter
- Years active: 2005–present

Omid Nezami (Persian: امید نظامی; born on October 7, 1984, in Kabul, Afghanistan) is an Afghan singer, reporter and tV presenter at TOLO TV channel. He has anchored a variety of shows on Afghanistan's television including Afghan Star and Bamdad khosh.

== Early life and career ==
Omid was born on 1985 in Kabul. He started his career by participating on Afghan Star as a competitor. Later on, he was asked to host a show on Arman FM Radio and then he became the main host of Afghan Star. He released his debut album in 2010 which is called Khabam namibarad. Zange Maktab is his most popular album which he released on 2013. Omid is currently a reporter of TOLO TV channel on Australia.
