= Syrian Female Oriental Band =

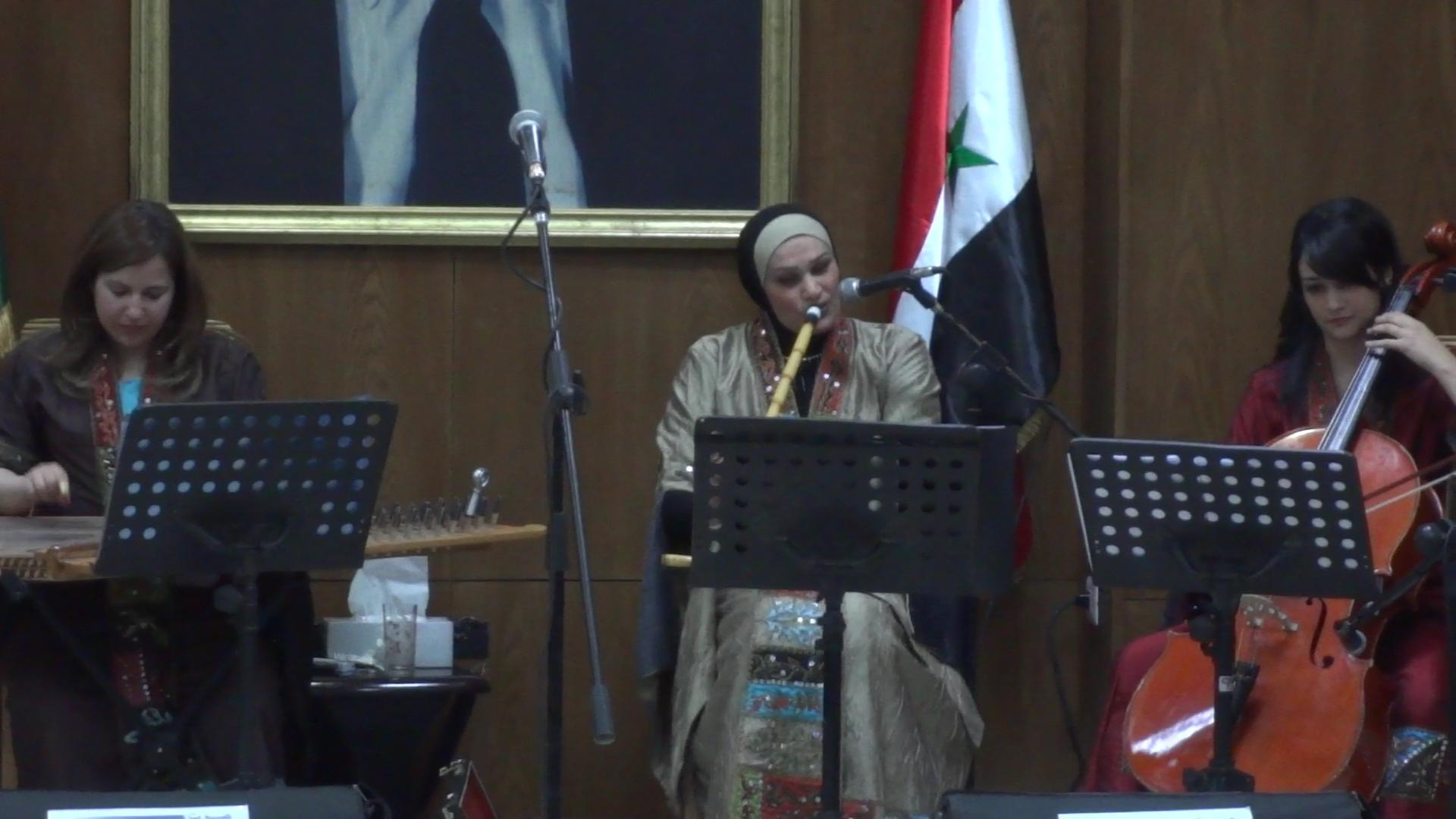

Background information
- Origin: Damascus, Syria
- Years active: 2003–present
- Labels: Classical music, folklore
- Members: Wafa'a Safar; Dima Mawazini; Rihab Azar; Razan Kassar; Hadeel Mirkhan; Raghad haddad Sana'a Wahba; Khesab Khaled

Syrian Female Oriental Band is a Syrian musical group, mainly playing Arabic music. Formed in 2003, the band consists of eight female graduates from the Higher Institute of Music in Damascus.

== Members ==
- Wafa'a Safar: ney (supervising)
- Dima Mawazini: qanun
- Rihab Azar: oud
- Razan Kassar: violin
- Hadeel Mirkhan: cello
- Raghad Haddad: viola
- Sana'a Wahba: double bass
- Khesab Khaled: riq
