= Jawad Ghaziyar =

جواد غازيار Jawad Ghaziyar
- Born: Afghanistan
- Genres: Pop; Classical Music
- Occupation: Singer
- Years active: 1976–present

Jawad Ghaziyar (Persian: جواد غازيار) is a popular Afghan singer. He is one of the 1980s era singers who took refuge in United States after the fall of Afghanistan government in 1992. Jawad was also a special judge in Season 8 of Afghan Star.

== Discography ==
(This list is not comprehensive and does not include albums released in Afghanistan)

- Melate Ghamdeeda
- Sadai-e-Maihaan
- Dost
- Chaman-e-Cheraghan
- Sanam
- Shireen-e-Roba
- Sahar
