= Ara Topouzian =

Armenian musician (born 1969)

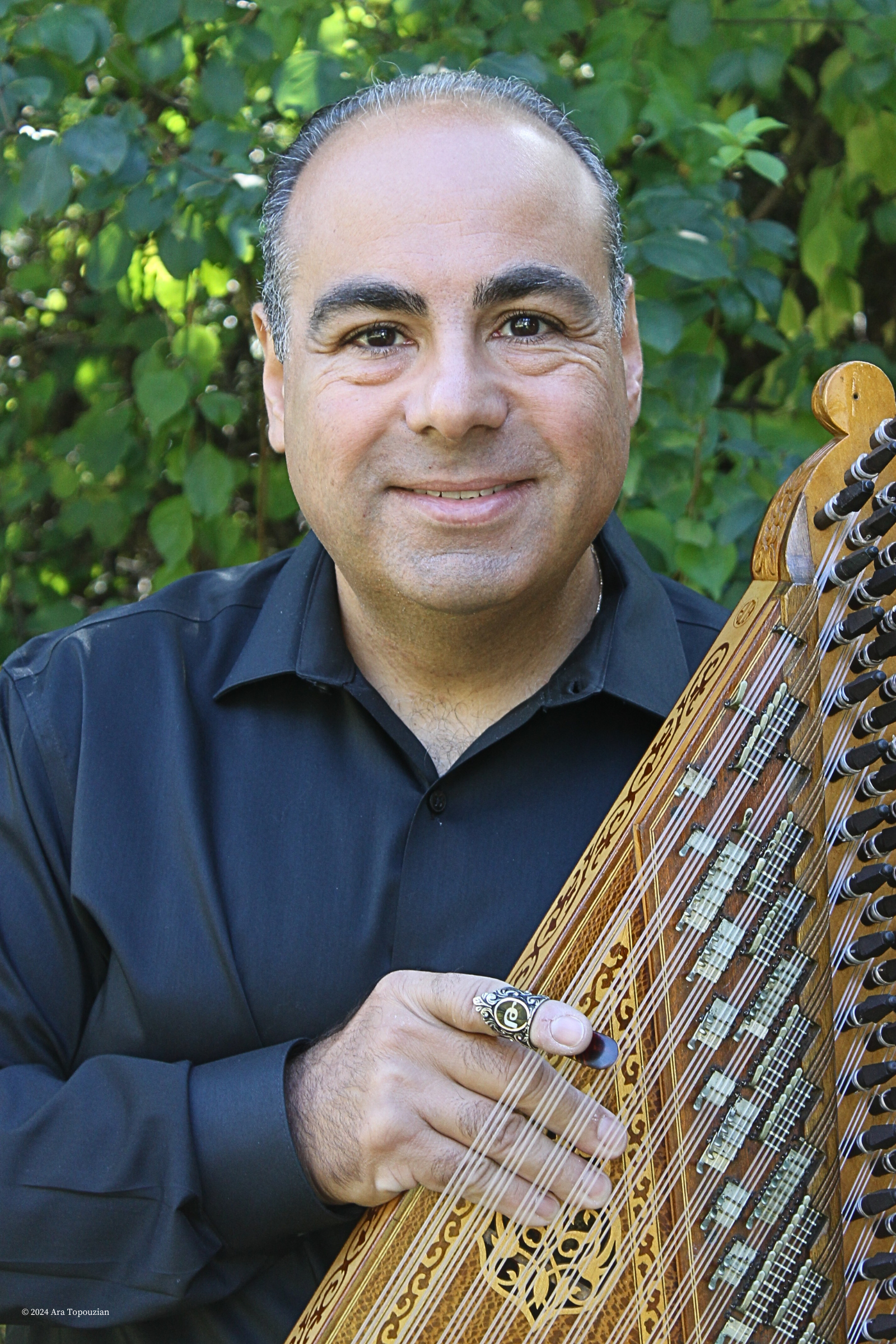
Topouzian and a kanun, an Armenian/Middle Eastern laptop harp with over 76 strings

Ara Topouzian (born in 1969) is an Armenian musician who began playing Armenian and Middle Eastern music in 1991. He plays the kanon.

== Biography ==
In 1991, Topouzian formed American Recording Productions (ARP) with the intent to record and preserve this type of world music. This record label has produced over thirty recordings of Armenian and Middle Eastern music, including one of his own albums, Live from Detroit.

In 2012, Topouzian was awarded a Kresge Artist Fellowship. He was among 24 literary and performing artists who received that year's fellowships, which support metro Detroit artists. He was also invited to the Virginia Commonwealth University Symphony, performing a composition written for the Kanun by VCU music professor and composer Doug Richards entitled "Ben Seni Variations.".

In 2013, Topouzian received a grant from the John S. and James L. Knight Foundation to produce a documentary on the history of Armenian music and the musicians from Detroit.

On March 16, 2015, Topouzian released a documentary on Detroit Public Television entitled Guardians of Music: A History of Armenian Music in Detroit.

On March 27, 2015, it was announced that Topouzian was the 2015 Artist in Residence in Farmington Hills, Michigan. This annual award is given to a resident of Farmington or Farmington Hills who displays exceptional talent and artistic accomplishments.

Topouzian performed a concert of Armenian music with proceeds benefiting the City of Farmington Hills Cultural Arts Division, which honored him with the Artist in Residence award on January 23, 2016.

== Other performances ==
In 2014, Topouzian joined the Mark Gavoor Ensemble to perform a concert of Armenian folk music in Walla Walla, Washington for Whitman College.

HOUR Media featured a story about Topouzian.

== Discography ==
- Live from Detroit: Ara Topouzian Ensemble
- Khnjook!
- Stringed Tranquility
- Faces of Bravery
- Whispers of Ellis Island
- Harmonic Classics
- Eastern Winds
- Full Circle
- For the Children of Armenia
- Near Eastern Ride
- Cafe Makam
- Zamperla
- In Transit
- A Miracle of Birds (2012) with Joshua Davis
- Homage: Ara Topouzian Quartet (2015)

== Film documentaries ==
These films use music by Topouzian.

- The Armenian Americans (2000)
- The Armenians, Story of Survival (2001)
- The Lighthouse (2001)
- Mountain Men and Holy Wars (2002)
- Images of the Armenian Spirit (2003)
- The Armenian Genocide (2006)
- Orphans of the Genocide (2014)
- Guardians of Music: A History of Armenian Music in Detroit (2015)

== Educational films ==
World Music: A Cultural Legacy (2000) was published by Glencow Division, McGraw Hill/Macmillan Press. It is a n educational audio package in teaching students the different forms of world music. Music from Khnjook! The Ara Topouzian Ensemble was utilized for this project.

Each unit of Our Musical World: The Middle East & North Africa (2012) includes broad discussions of under-emphasized topics in Western education; stories and interviews from the musicians, educators, or youth of the culture-groups discussed, and creative musical samples. Our Musical World looks at the culture and music of Armenia. Topouzian narrates and demonstrates the kanun and Armenian music, which evolved over injustices imposed by the former Ottoman Empire.

== Non-profit organizations ==
Topouzian also serves on the board of directors of the Michigan Economic Developers Association. In 2014, he began his second term and was chairman of the organization.

In 2014, Topouzian joined the board of directors of Creative Many (formerly Artserve).

In 2013, Topouzian left the City of Novi as their economic development director and was appointed CEO of the Troy Chamber of Commerce.

In 2017, Topouzian was appointed by Michigan Governor Rick Snyder to the Michigan Council of Arts and Cultural Affairs.

In 2026, Topouzian serves on the Board of Directors of the Cultural Advocacy Network.

== Awards ==
In 2013, Topouzian received the Mike Conboy Professional Development Award for outstanding contribution to the Michigan Economic Developers Association.

In 2015, Topouzian received the 2015 Overall Winner Diversity Business Leader Award from Corp! magazine for recognition of outstanding leadership in diversity and multiculturalism in the State of Michigan.

In 2016 and 2017, Topouzian received the Best of Detroit from HOUR magazine under the category of Best Local Band (Original Music).

In 2015, Topouzian was awarded second place for "Vote 4 The Best", sponsored by WDIV Television.

In 2015, Topouzian was awarded Artist in Residence by the City of Farmington Hills, Michigan.

In 2022, Topouzian was awarded a Michigan Heritage Award from the Michigan Traditional Arts Program through Michigan State University.
