= Qanun (instrument) =

Middle Eastern string instrument

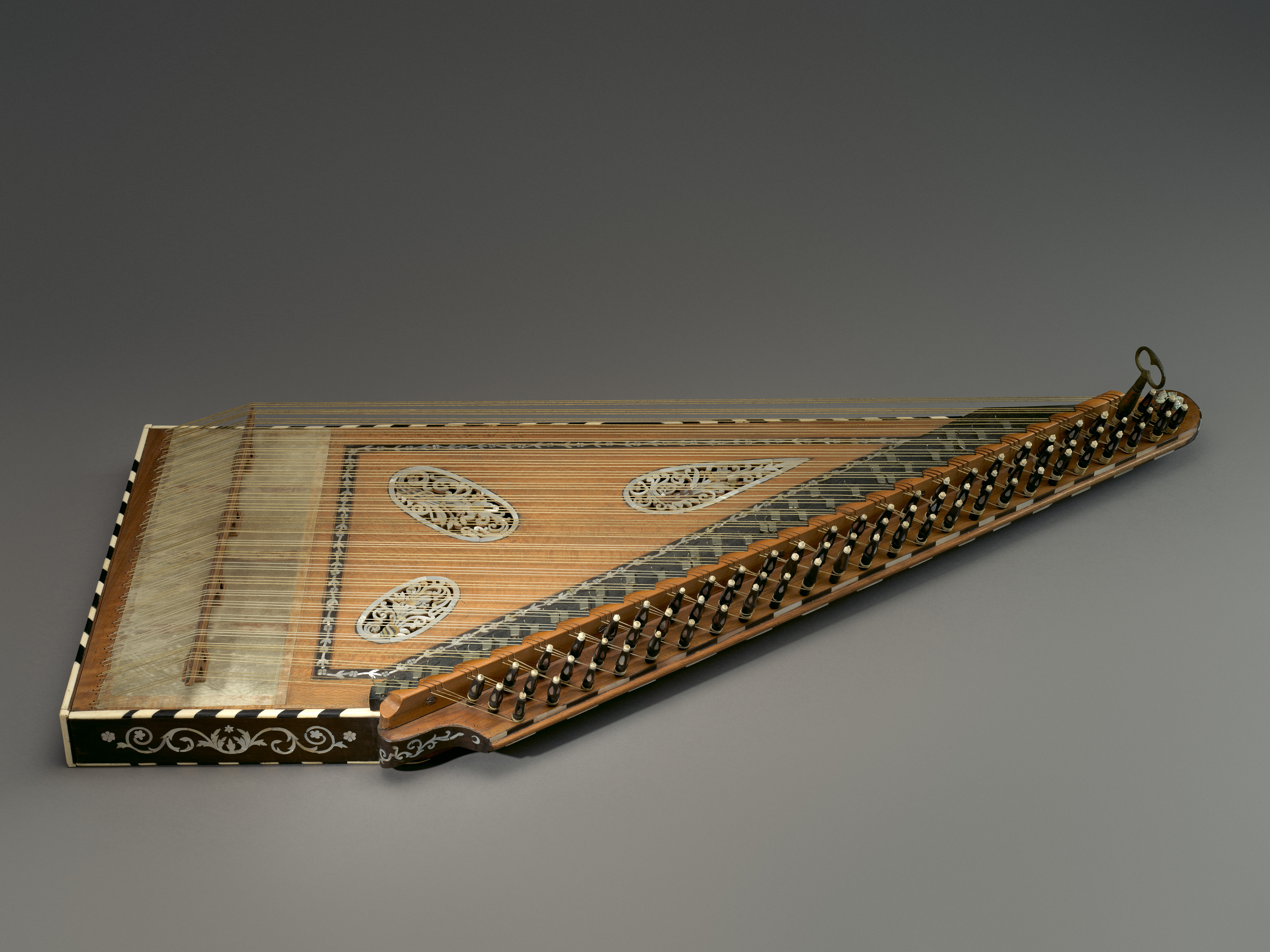
- A 19th-century qanun

String instrument
- Classification: String instruments; Box zither
- Developed: Antiquity

Playing range
- (F2)A2-E6(G6)

Related instruments
- Dan tranh; Gayageum; Guzheng; Jadagan; Jetigen; Kacapi; Kanklės; Kantele; Kokle; Koto; Psaltery; Se; Swarmandal; Yatga; Zither

Qanun music during the 5th anniversary of Wikimedia Armenia

The qanun, kanun, ganoun or kanoon (Arabic: قانون, romanized: qānūn; Armenian: քանոն, romanized: k’anon; Sorani Kurdish: قانون, romanized: qānūn; Greek: κανονάκι, romanized: kanonáki, qanun; Persian: قانون, qānūn; Turkish: kanun; Azerbaijani: qanun; Uyghur: قالون, romanized: qalon) is a Middle Eastern string instrument played either solo, or more often as part of an ensemble, in much of Armenia, Iran, Modern Turkey, Greece, Arab East, and Maghreb region of North Africa; later, due to Arab migration, it reached West Africa and Central Asia. The instrument is a type of large zither with a thin trapezoidal soundboard that is famous for its unique melodramatic sound.

== Etymology ==
The name derives ultimately from Ancient Greek κανών (kanōn) 'rule, law, norm, principle'. The qanun traces one of its origins to a stringed Assyrian instrument from the Old Assyrian Empire, specifically from the nineteenth century BC in Mesopotamia. This instrument came inscribed on a box of elephant ivory found in the old Assyrian capital Nimrud (ancient name: Caleh).

== Regional variants and technical specifications ==
Arabic qanuns are usually constructed with five skin insets that support a single long bridge resting on five arching pillars, whereas the somewhat smaller Turkish qanuns are based on just four. This allows Arabic variants of the instrument to have more room for the installation of extreme bass and treble strings. Kanuns manufactured in Turkey generally feature 26 courses of strings, with three strings per course in the case of all regional variants. Contemporary Arabic designs use Nylon or PVF strings that are stretched over the bridge poised on fish-skins as described on one end, and attached to wooden tuning pegs at the other end.

Ornamental sound holes called kafes are a critical component of what constitutes the accustomed timbre of qanun. However, they normally occupy different locations on the soundboard of Turkish kanuns compared to Arabic qanuns, and may also vary in shape, size and number depending on geography or personal taste.

The dimensions of a Turkish kanun are typically 95 to 100 cm (37–39") in length, 38 to 40 cm (15–16") in width, and 4 to 6 cm (1.5–2.3") in height. In contrast, an Arabic qanun measures a bit larger as mentioned.

Qanun is played on the lap while sitting or squatting, or sometimes on trestle support, by plucking the strings with two tortoise-shell picks (one for each hand) or with fingernails, and has a standard range of three and a half octaves from A2 to E6 that can be extended down to F2 and up to G6 in the case of Arabic designs.

The instrument also features special metallic levers or latches under each course called mandals. These small levers, which can be raised or lowered quickly by the performer while the instrument is being played, serve to slightly change the pitch of a particular course by altering effective string lengths.

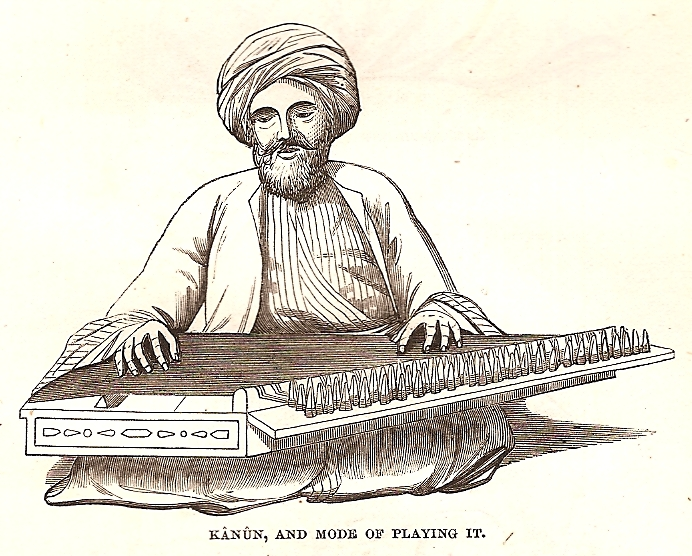
Qanun performer in Jerusalem, 1859. Thomson, p. 577.

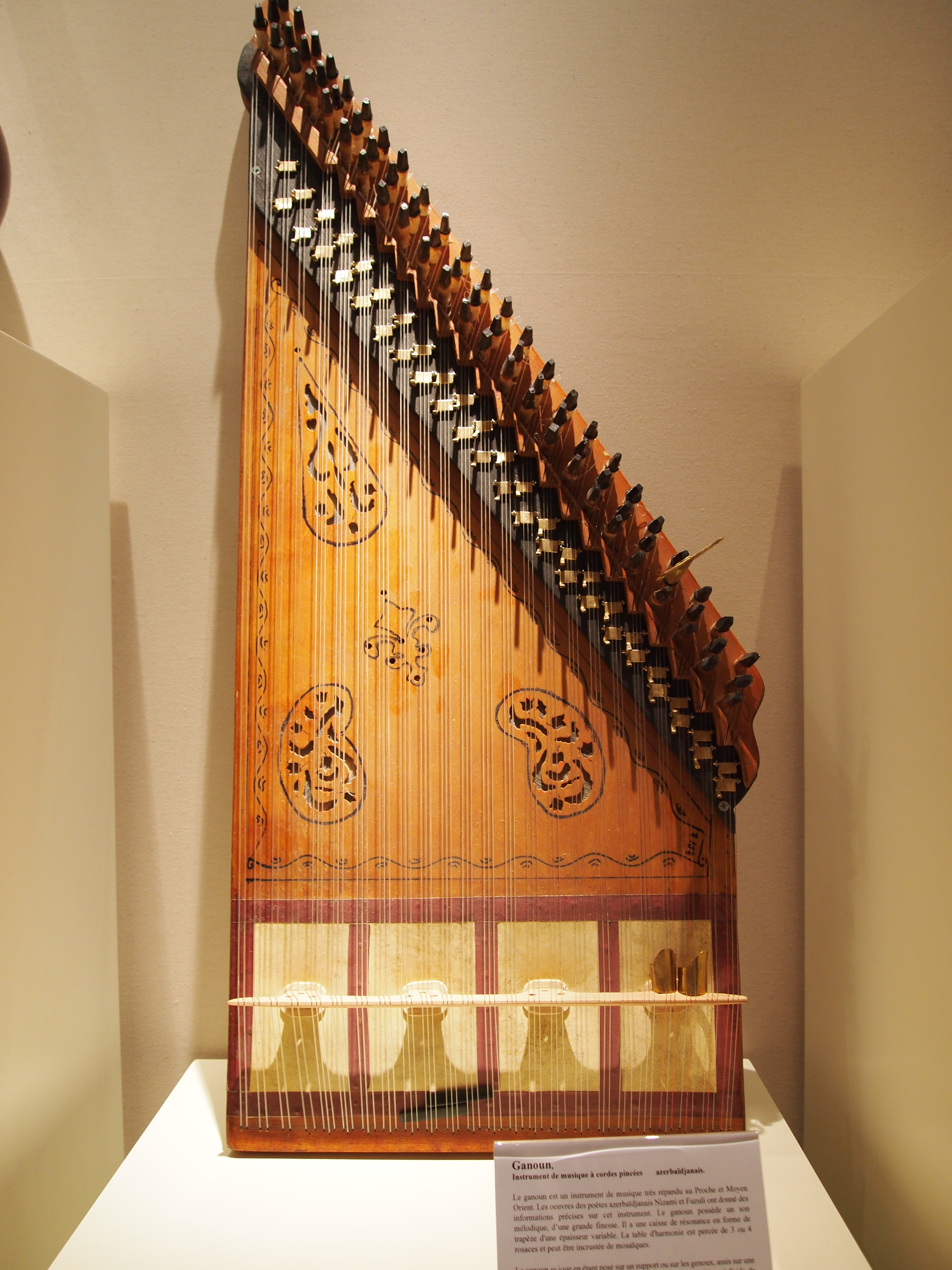
Typical Azerbaijanian qanun. Museum of Cognac (France)

== Tuning and temperament ==
On the regular diatonically tuned qanun, mandal technology was first implemented, according to Turkish musicologist Rauf Yekta, some 30 years prior to his submission of his invited monograph on Turkish Music to the 1922 edition of Albert Lavignac's Encyclopédie de la Musique et Dictionnaire du Conservatoire. Levantine qanuns, prior to that time, remained rather inflexible and cumbersome to perform on (especially as demanding modulations/transpositions came into vogue that were increasingly emulating Western tonality and key changes), requiring the player to use the fingernail of the thumb to depress on the leftmost ends of the courses to achieve on-the-fly intervallic alterations.

With the advent of electronic tuners some decades later, standardization of the placement of reference mandals on the qanun began. While Armenian kanuns now employ only equidistant half-tones and Arabic qanuns exact quarter-tones as a result, Turkish kanun-makers went so far as dividing the electroacoustically referenced equal-tempered semitone of 100 cents into 6 equal parts, yielding – for all intents and purposes – 72 equal divisions (or commas) of the octave pitch resolution. Not all pitches of 72-tone equal temperament are available on the Turkish kanun, however, since kanun-makers affix mandals that only accommodate modulations/transpositions popularly demanded by performers. This has subsequently led to the familiar interrupted and irregular pattern of mandals on the Turkish kanun becoming a visual guide for players, in facilitating modal and intonational navigation on an instrument which is ordinarily bereft of pitch markers. Some kanun-makers may also choose to divide the semitone distance from the nut of the lower registers into 7 parts instead for microtonal subtlety (and the highest registers, conversely, into 5 parts due to spacing constraints); but do so at the expense of octave equivalences. Despite the mentioned discrepancies, hundreds of mandal configurations are at the player's disposal when performing on an ordinary Turkish kanun.

On the other hand, the nowadays widespread application of equidistant 24-tones on Arabic and 72-tones on Turkish qanun models presents an ongoing source of controversy. This is particularly in regards to how adequate such Eurocentric octave divisions are in faithfully reproducing the traditionally or classically understood fluid pitches and inflexions of Arabic music or Ottoman classical music scales. Pitch measurement analyses of relevant audio recordings reveal that, equal temperaments based on bike-chained "multiples of twelve" are essentially not compatible with authentic Middle Eastern performances; substantiating the notion instruments strictly based on them would clash audibly with a justly tuned/intoned tanbur, oud, ney, or kemenche.

Alternate tuning approaches for the qanun thus also exist. Turkish music theorist Ozan Yarman has proposed, for example, an academical 79-tone temperament for the expression within tolerable error-margins of Maqamat / Makamlar / Dastgaha at all pitch levels, that was implemented by the renowned late luthier Ejder Güleç (1939–2014) on a Turkish kanun. Likewise, the late Swiss-French qānūn performer Julien Jalâl Ed-Dine Weiss (1953–2015), who was critical of the tuning deficiency of Eurocentric octave divisions in approximating just intervals, is known to have conceived, since 1990, a number of prototypes that were entirely based on low prime-limit or simple integer ratio Pythagorean and harmonic intervals; which were once again built, on instructions from Weiss, by Ejder Güleç.

== Notable players ==
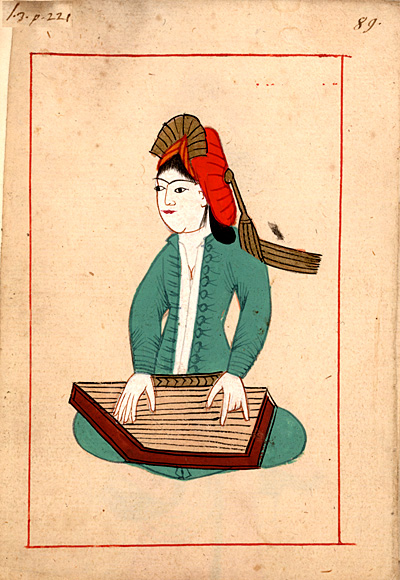
Kanûnî, from Rålamb Costume Book, 1657.

- Anzhela Atabekyan
- Göksel Baktagir
- Aytaç Doğan
- Mohammad-abdo Saleh
- Petros Tabouris
- Ara Topouzian
- Henry Azra
- Maya Youssef

== See also ==
- Çeng
- Psaltery
- Santur
- Zither
