= Giuliano Modarelli =

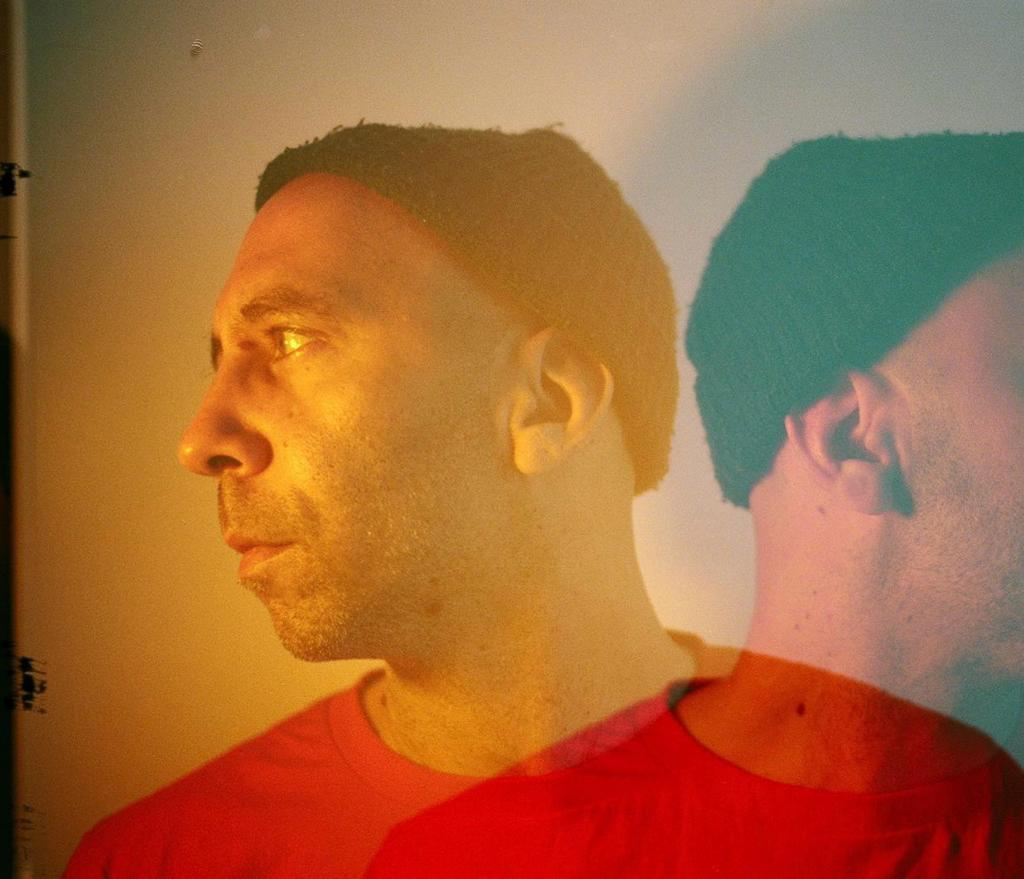

Background information
- Origin: Milan, Italy
- Genres: Indian Classical Music, Jazz, World Music, Jazz fusion
- Instrument: guitar
- Years active: 2000-
- Website: www.giuliano-modarelli.com

Giuliano Modarelli (born 1977) is a guitarist, composer and producer from Italy.

== Biography ==
Born in Milan in 1977, he moved to England in 2000 where he attended Leeds College of Music. After receiving his Bachelor in jazz music in 2003 he became a full-time musician and started playing with bands like Sawa Teen, Raga Nova and Nshwa with which he played in important festivals such as Bestival and Moor Music Festival and on BBC Radio.

In these years he became interested in Indian music and he started studying it with the Indian sitar master Dharambir Singh, sarod maestros Buddhadev Dasgupta and Prattyush Bannerjee.

He is the founder of the fusion collective Samay and the award-winning ensemble Kefaya with which he has been invited to participate in international festivals like the Womad, Latitude, London Jazz Festival, Darbar Festival, Music Port Festival and radio and television shows on BBC 1/2/3/6 and Asian Network and Doordarshan TV UK.

In 2008, with famous tabla player Bickram Ghosh, he composed music for Bollywood films Little Zizou and The Diamond Murders. In the same year he toured India with Ghosh and percussionist Pete Lockett supporting a musical performance called "East meets West" that made him appear in many Indian national TV programs.

== Discography ==
Albums

=== Solo ===
- Englobed - 2012 Manush Records

=== Sawa Teen ===
- Sawa Teen – 2004

=== Samay ===
- Songs for a Global Journey – 2008

=== Bickram Ghosh & Pete Lockett ===
- Kingdom of Rhythm - 2008

=== Kefaya ===
- Radio International - 2016
- Songs of our Mothers - 2019

=== Sarathy Korwar ===
- Day to Day - 2016 Ninja Tune

=== Olcay Bayir ===
- Ruya - 2019 ARC Music

=== Soundtracks ===
- Little Zizou – 2008
- The Diamond murders – 2008
- Naga The Ethernal Yogi - 2016 (composer)
