= Split-finger =

Type of drumming technique

The "split-finger" or "split-hand" technique is a common drumming technique (used mainly on Egyptian style goblet drums and Indian drums like tabla and kanjira) which was made popular by the famous Turkish drummer, Mısırlı Ahmet. Mısırlı Ahmet studied and practiced drumming in Egypt, hence 'Mısırlı' (the Egyptian).

There are various ways of implementing the split finger technique, using one hand, or interlacing the hits using both hands.

The one hand split finger. This involves striking the rim of the drum head (or a bit further down) with a downwards (or diagonal) movement of the index finger of your ornament hand (that is the left hand for right-handed people, or the right hand for left-handed people) and from there, with no extra movement, bringing your ring finger up with a slight twist to strike the rim (or close to the rim). When this is done correctly each hit should sound like a regular "ka" (which is a standard rim hit with the ornament hand).

The two hand split finger. This is a combination of right and left hand strikes. The table below shows the most common ways that it is done.

Note: A side-to-side motion with the hands is more ideal and efficient when doing the two hand split finger (for speed and comfort).

Also note: a "Tek" is a standard rim hit with the main hand (not ornament).

{The below configuration is for right-handed people; for left-handed the order of the fingers is reversed}

1. Index finger, index finger, ring finger, ring finger

  RIGHT HAND   LEFT HAND     RIGHT HAND    LEFT HAND

2. Ring finger, index finger, index finger, ring finger

  RIGHT HAND    LEFT HAND     RIGHT HAND   LEFT HAND

3. Index finger, ring finger, index finger, ring finger

  RIGHT HAND   RIGHT HAND    LEFT HAND     LEFT HAND

4. Ring finger, index finger, index finger, ring finger

  RIGHT HAND    RIGHT HAND   LEFT HAND     LEFT HAND

5. Tek, index finger, Tek, ring finger

  RIGHT HAND    LEFT HAND   RIGHT HAND     LEFT HAND

6. Tek, Index finger, ring finger, index finger, Tek, ring finger, index finger, ring finger

  RIGHT HAND  LEFT HAND  LEFT HAND  LEFT HAND  RIGHT HAND  LEFT HAND  LEFT HAND  LEFT HAND

The result of each one of these combinations is that there are 4 rim hits for each beat making a very fast roll at anything over 200 beats per minute.

Note: the last combination (number 6) is over 2 beats, making for 4 strikes also per beat (not 8 strikes).

Note 2: There is a more efficient way of doing the split hand technique, which doesn't allow the fingers or wrists to become sore, and doesn't involve as much wrist movement as the above-mentioned way. This is done by using a more "side to side" movement than an "up and down" movement with the wrists. This generally increases speed without hurting the wrists.
