= Henry Azra =

Moroccan musician

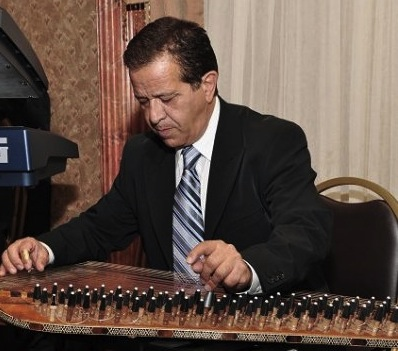
- Born: January 21, 1952
- Other names: Henri Azra
- Occupation: Musician
- Known for: Classical Moroccan music

Henry Azra, also spelled Henri Azra, (born 21 January 1952 in Casablanca, Morocco) is a Los Angeles–based classical Moroccan musician. Henry Azra is the son of the renowned international Kanunist, Salim Azra, who contributed to much of the success of Samy Elmaghribi and Salim Halali. Salim Azra was a favorite to King Mohammad V and was regularly asked to play at the King's Royal Palace. Following in his late father's footsteps, Henry is famously known for playing the Kanun.

== Early life ==
Henry Azra was born in Casablanca and moved to Canada at age thirteen. Growing up in Montreal, Azra became a student of his father; his life revolved around music and he spent much of his childhood learning about musicianship. Over the years, Henry Azra learned to master numerous instruments including the Kanun, Oud, Darbuka and Violin.

Not widely known, Henry Azra in fact first started his career as a musician by playing the Darbuka at various musical clubs with his father in Montreal long before playing the Kanun. After years of playing the Darbuka, Azra slowly transitioned to the Kanun. As years went by, recognition throughout Quebec for his special talents grew. Henry Azra later moved to Los Angeles to continue his stardom and started his life there with his wife, Violette, and three children.

Henry Azra is considered by many a virtuoso and is rated one of the top Qanunists.

== Music career ==
His first professional recording experience was performing in the 1980s in Los Angeles, California, with Heidi, one of Iran’s top traditional singers. Henry Azra played and recorded music with various Middle Eastern singers from around the world, including Haim Louk, Samy Elmaghribi, Ragheb Alama, and George Wassouf. In addition, Azra performed with Wadih El Safi, Sabah, Sayed Mekawy, a major composer for the world-famous singer, Oum Kalthoum, and many more. Azra currently performs classical Middle Eastern sensations around the world with his orchestra as the ensemble director.
