= Kefaya (band) =

International world music band

- Origin: Afghanistan, England, Italy,
- Genres: World music; Jazz fusion; Electronic music; Ethnic music; Folk
- Years active: 2012–present
- Label: Bella Union
- Members: Giuliano Modarelli; Al MacSween; Elaha Soroor; Joost Hendrickx
- Website: www.kefaya-music.com

Kefaya are an international world music London-based ensemble consisting of italian guitarist Giuliano Modarelli, british keyboardist Al MacSween, afghan-hazara singer Elaha Soroor and british drummer Joost Hendrickx. Other regular members of the live show include: Camilo Tirado (live electronics), Domenico Angarano (bass), Gurdain Rayatt (tabla), Deepa Nair Rasiya (vocals), Cormac Byrne (percussion).

== History ==
The band was formed in 2012 by Giuliano Modarelli and Al MacSween and released its first album, Radio International on 14 October 2016.

In 2019, Afghan-Hazara singer Elaha Soroor joined the band for the second album called Songs Of Our Mothers released by Bella Union label on 27 September.

== Recognitions ==
In 2017 and 2020 the band received the Best Newcomer and Best Fusion Awards, respectively, from the Songlines magazine.

== Discography ==
- Radio International (2016, Radio International)
- Songs Of Our Mothers as "Kefaya + Elaha Soroor" (2019, Bella Union)
- Our Freedoms Must Be Won as "Kefaya + Elaha Soroor" (2026, Radio International)
