= The Voice of Afghanistan =

Afghan reality talent show

- Genre: Talent show
- Presented by: Ahmad Popal
- Judges: Nazir Khara; Aryana Sayeed; Qais Ulfat; Obaid Juenda; Fereshta Samah
- Country of origin: Afghanistan
- Original language: Dari
- No. of seasons: 2

Production
- Producer: Kaboora Productions
- Production locations: Kabul, Afghanistan

Original release
- Network: Tolo TV
- Release: May 31, 2013 – October 17, 2014

Related
- Afghan Star

The Voice of Afghanistan is an Afghan reality talent show based on the original Dutch version of the program created by John de Mol and is part of a wider international franchise.

The series employs a panel of four coaches who critique the artists' performances and guide their teams of selected artists through the remainder of the season. They also compete to ensure that their act wins the competition, thus making them the winning coach. The original panel featured Aryana Sayeed, Qais Ulfat, Nazir Khara, and Obaid Juenda; the panel for the second season features Ulfast, Juenda, Khara, and new coach Fereshta Samah.

In early 2015, Tolo TV announced that they had no plans for a third season.

== Selection process and format ==
Each season begins with the "Blind Auditions," where coaches form their team of artists (12) whom they mentor through the remainder of the season. The coaches' chairs are faced towards the audience during artists' performances; those interested in an artist press their button, which turns their chair towards the artist and illuminates the bottom of the chair to read "I want you." At the conclusion of the performance, an artist either defaults to the only coach who turned around, or selects his or her coach if more than one coach expresses interest.

In the "Battle Rounds" each coach pairs two of his or her team members to perform together, then their coach chooses the winner of the battle will advanced to the live shows and the loser will be eliminated.

In the final live performance phase of the competition, artists perform in weekly shows, where public voting narrows to a final group of artists and eventually declares a winner. The coaches have the power to save one artist that had not received the public's vote that week. As of season two, these artists would give a last chance performance to win their coach's save. However, in deciding who moves on to the final four phase, the television audience and the coaches have equal say. With one team member remaining for each coach, the contestants compete against each other in the finale, where the outcome is decided solely by public vote. In the first two seasons, one contestant from each team would advance to the final four.

== Series overview ==
- Team Qais
- Team Aryana
- Team Nazir
- Team Obaid
- Team Fereshta

Season	First aired	Last aired	Winner	Runner-up	Other finalists		Winning coach	Presenters		Coaches (chair order)			
Season	First aired	Last aired	Winner	Runner-up	Other finalists		Winning coach	Main	Backstage	1	2	3	4
1	May 31, 2013	Oct 6, 2013	Jawed Yosufi	Sediqullah Farazi	Subhan Nedayi	Zubair Sorood	Nazir Khara	Ahmad Popal	Khadija Sadat	Qais	Aryana	Nazir	Obaid
2	May 30, 2014	Oct 17, 2014	Najeebullah Shirzad	Bashir Ahmad	Abdul Hai Amiri	Wahida Hakim	Qais Ulfat	Omid Nezami	Khadija Sadat	Qais	Fereshta	Nazir	Obaid

== See also ==
- Afghan Star
