= Anzhela Atabekyan =

- Born: Anzhela Atabekyan; April 11, 1938 (age 87)
- Origin: Yerevan, Armenia
- Genres: folk music
- Occupations: Kanun player, musicologist, art historian, educator
- Instrument: Kanun
- Years active: 1956-present

Anzhela Atabekyan (Armenian: Անժելա Աթաբեկյան, born April 11, 1938, in Yerevan) is an Armenian kanun (kanon) player, musicologist, art historian, and professor at the Yerevan State Conservatory. She was awarded the title of People's Artist of the Armenian Soviet Socialist Republic in 1986.

== Biography ==
Anzhela Atabekyan was born in Yerevan. She is a descendant of the House of Atabekians. she graduated from the Yerevan State Musical College Named after Romanos Melikyan in 1955, and continued her studies at the Yerevan State Conservatory, graduating in 1983.

From 1956 to 1993 she was a soloist of the Folk Instruments Ensemble of the Armenian TV and Radio Company. In 1959-2000 she taught at the Romanos Melikyan Music College; since 2003 - at the Komitas State Conservatory of Yerevan.

Anzhela Atabekyan has compiled and edited 2 methodological manuals. In 1972 Atabekyan founded the "Atabekyan Sisters" vocal-instrumental ensemble. She is also the founding member of the Mealiq Unity NGO since 2012.

== Awards ==
- People's Artist of the Armenian Soviet Socialist Republic (1986)
- Laureate of the 1st Republican (Gold Medal, 1957), All-Union (First Degree Diploma, 1957) Youth Festival, Laureate of the Union of Pop Singers (1958).

== Gallery ==
Concert dedicated to Anzhela Atabekyan's 80th anniversary at Yerevan Komitas State Conservatory

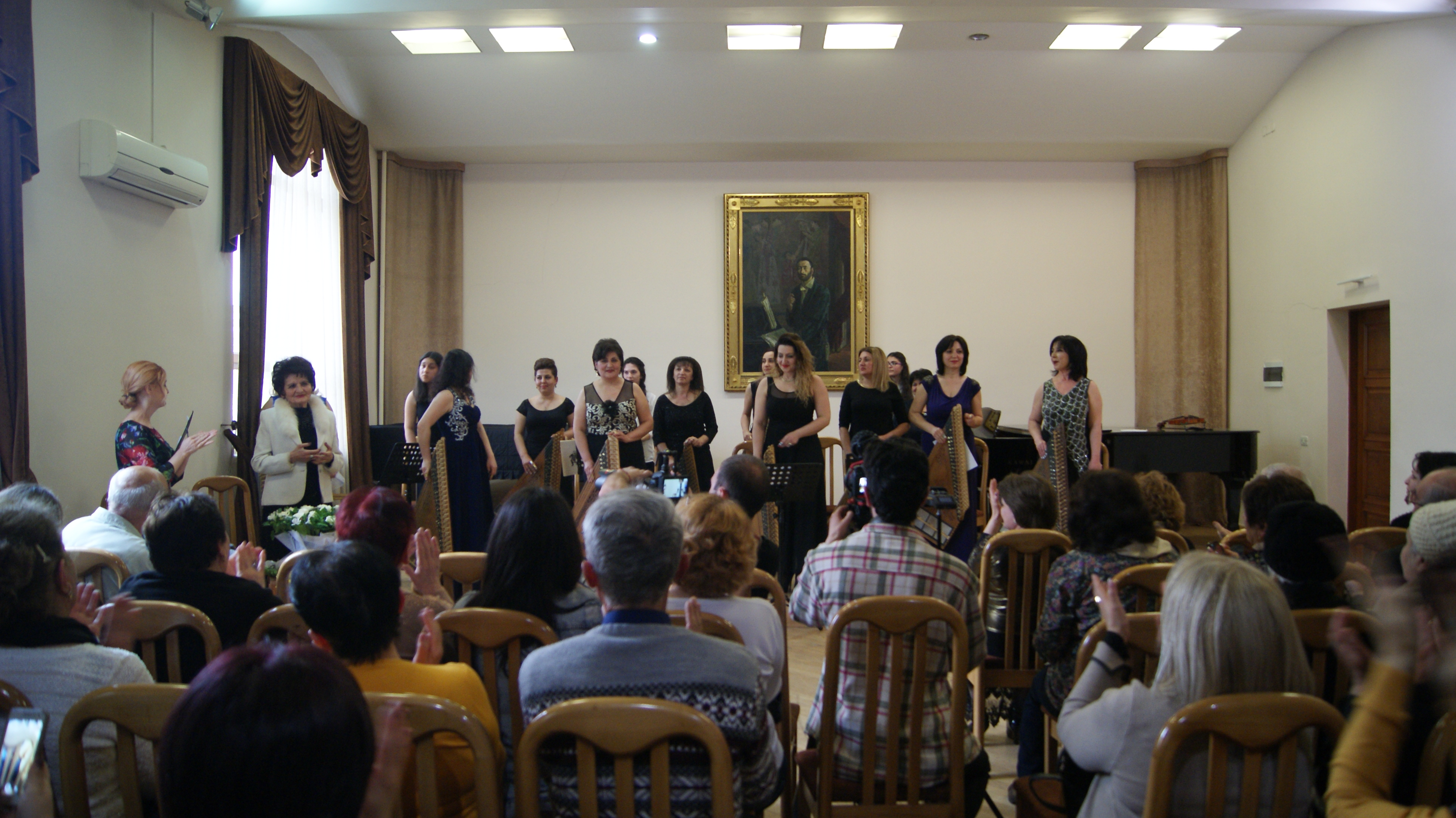

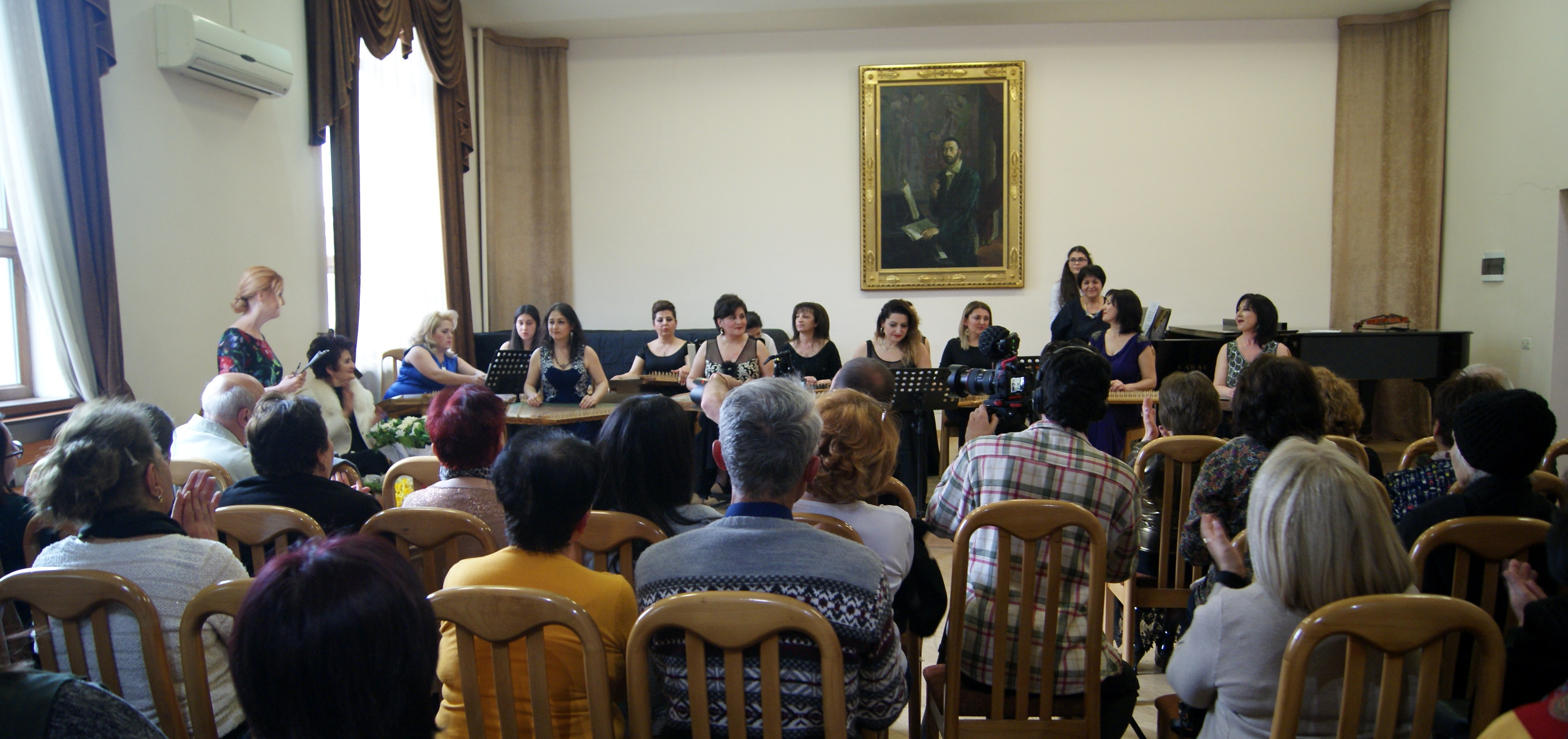

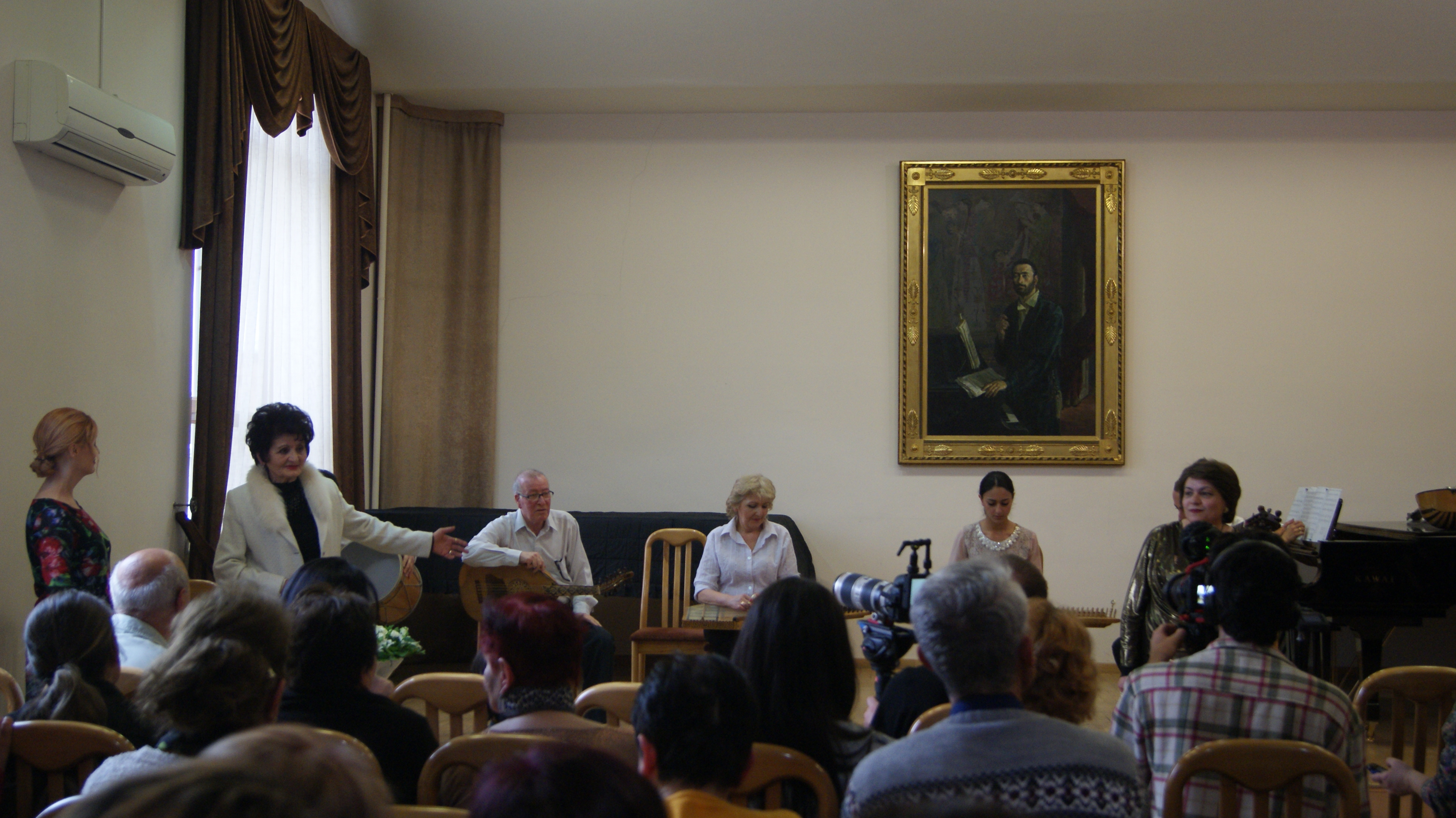
