= Aryana Sayeed =

Afghan singer (born 1985)

- آريانا سعيد
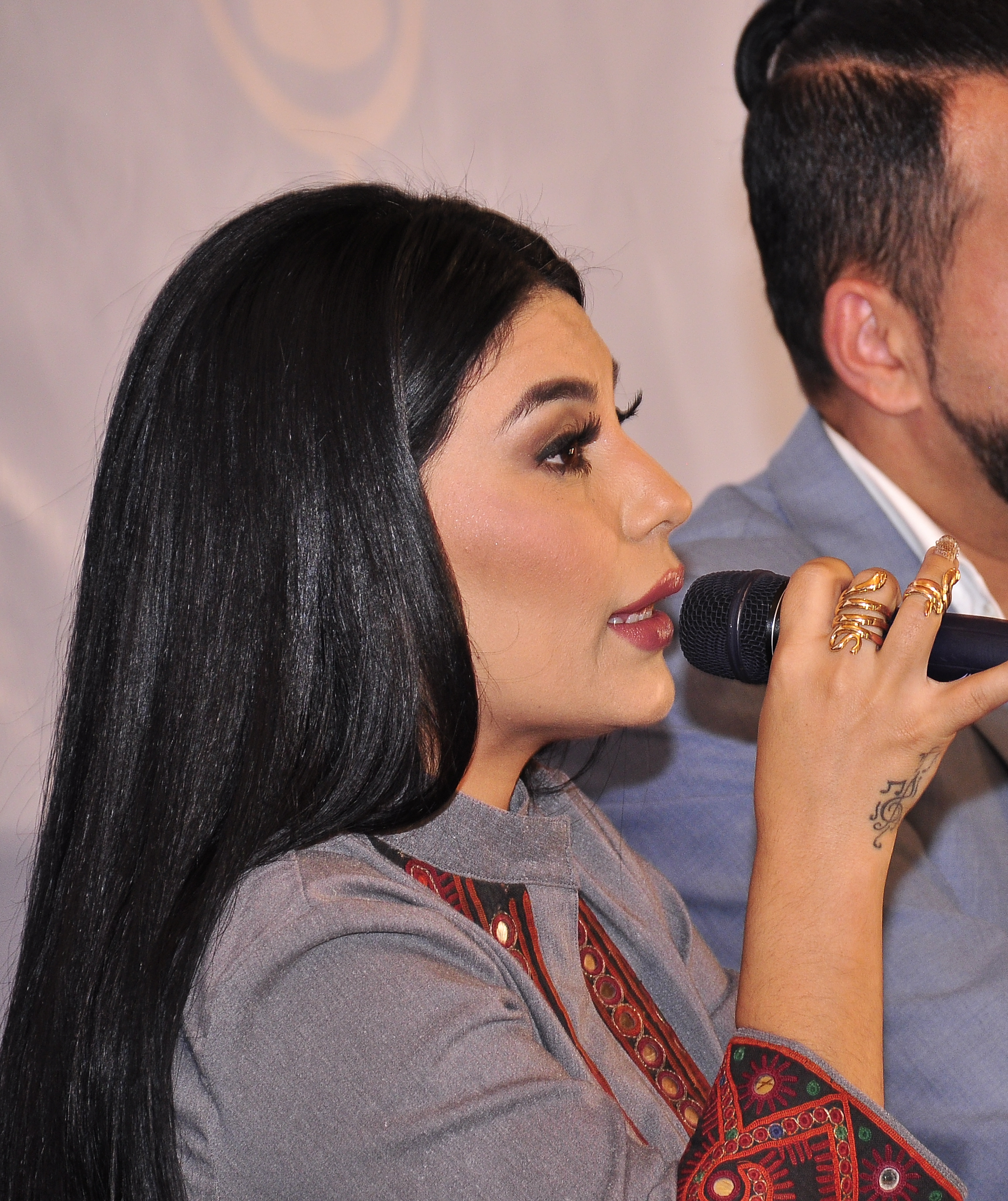
- Aryana Sayeed giving a speech
- Born: 1985 (age 40–41); Kabul, Democratic Republic of Afghanistan
- Occupations: Singer; Musician; Songwriter; Philanthropist; Goodwill Ambassador
- Years active: 2008–present
- Relatives: Nadia Nadim (niece)
- Musical career
- Genres: Pop music; R&B; hip hop; Afghan folkloric music
- Instruments: Vocals; guitar; piano
- Label: Sherzaad Entertainment
- Website: facebook.com/aryanamusic

Aryana Sayeed (Pashto/Dari: آريانا سعيد, born 1985) is an Afghan pop singer and women rights activist. She sings mostly in Persian but also has many songs in Pashto. Sayeed also had hosting roles in musical television shows for the 1TV and has served as a Judge on musical talent shows such as TheVoice Afghanistan, Afghan Star and Afghan Superstar TOLO networks. Sayeed has established herself as one of Afghanistan's most famous contemporary musical artists, performing regularly in concerts and philanthropic festivals within and outside Afghanistan.

== Early life and education ==
Sayeed was born in 1985 in Kabul, Afghanistan to an ethnic Pashtun father and a Persian-speaking mother. She left Afghanistan with her parents when she was 8 years old and lived in Islamabad, Pakistan before briefly settling in Switzerland and then in London, England. By the age of 12, she had obtained admission to a music school where she would perform in places with a choir.

== Music career ==
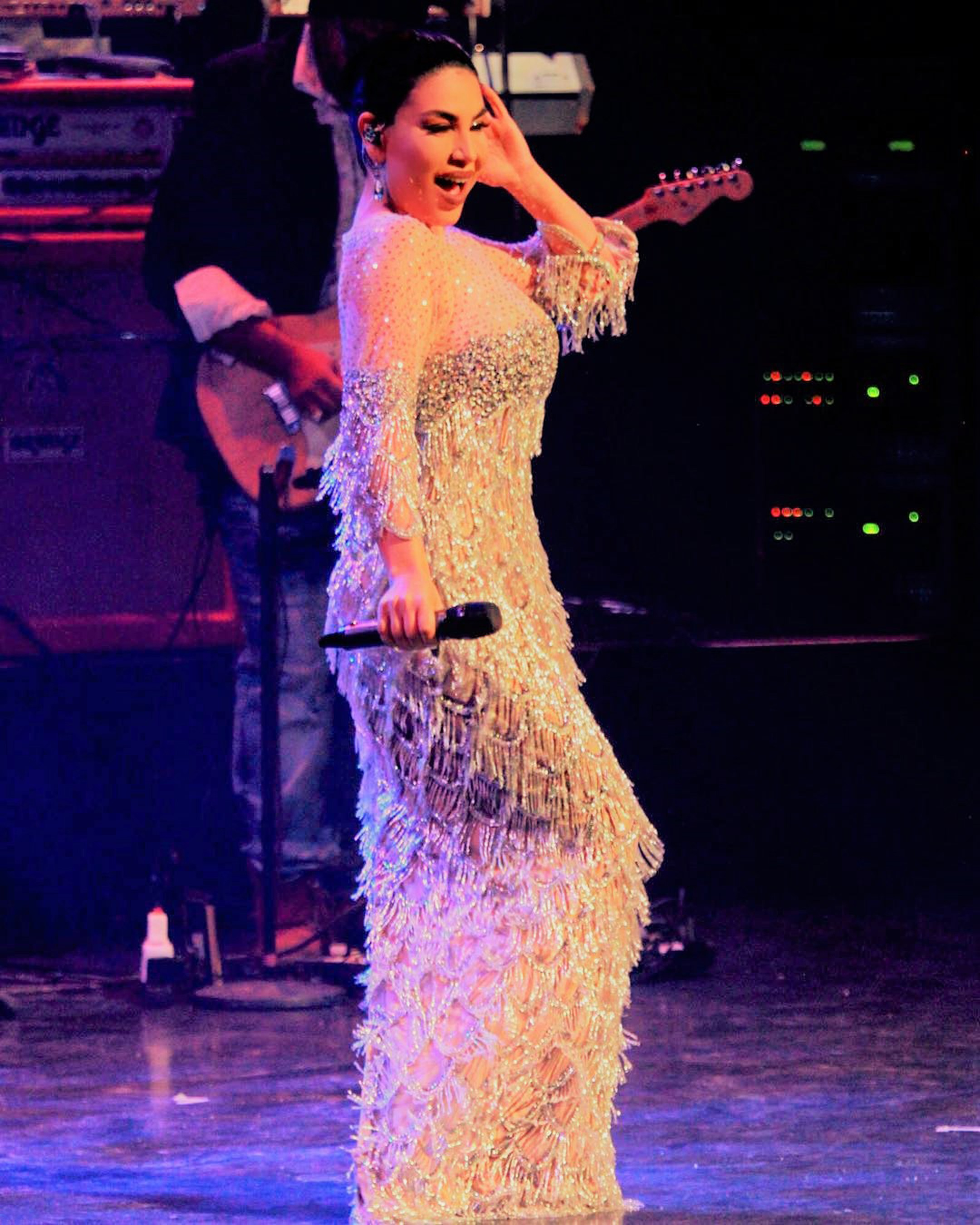
Sayeed performing in 2019

Sayeed's first single, in 2009, was Mashallah. However, the turning point in her career came after her song Afghan Pesarak was released in 2010. Aryana Sayeed eventually became a household name in many Afghan homes outside Afghanistan and was requested to perform at many concerts around the world. At the peak of all the sudden success, Aryana decided to go to Afghanistan and perform at concerts in her fragile home country.

Aryana rose to fame there with her version of an old classic Afghan song, Gule Seb. It was during these initial days in Afghanistan when she filmed her next song Dilam Tang Ast. The success of the song resulted in an Award for best song filmed inside Afghanistan at the Aryana Television Awards. It also resulted in a new career as a TV host at one of Afghanistan's leading entertainment channels. Her next song Hairanam did reasonably well. Aryana followed this up with an upbeat nationalistic song to encourage the art of sports in her country. Several singers were signed on to make the song, Afghanistan Afghanistan.

Sayeed's song Banoo e Atash Nasheen, which describes the pain the women of Afghanistan have faced over years of war and abuse, has won her enormous critical acclaim. A large orchestra has contributed to the music of the song and the shooting took place inside Afghanistan. Shortly after the song was released, Aryana was asked for an interview by the BBC to explain her reason and meaning behind the song. Her next big hit was Anaram Anaram which put Aryana back at the top of the charts in Afghanistan, and was requested on the show Yak Sabad Gul on Nooor TV with Yousif & Myenn on November 25, 2014 but the official music video was released on October 24, 2014 produced by Daf Entertainment.

In 2019, Sayeed won the Afghan Icon Award and was named the 2017 Best Female Artist of Afghanistan. She also received the title "Voice of Afghanistan" from the Afghanistan National Television and Radio Network. Aryana has also received awards for Best Song of the Year, Best Video of the Year, and a Bravery Award.

== Television career ==
It wasn't long before Aryana Sayeed was signed on by one of the leading entertainment channels in Afghanistan, 1TV. Her show, Music Night (Shab-e Mosiqi), involved her performing and interviewing other artists. The show was a success and after the first season Aryana left to go back home in London. Shortly after this Aryana Sayeed was signed by TOLO TV as one of the judges at The Voice of Afghanistan in 2013. She continued her collaboration with the TV station and subsequently became a judge on another talent show, Afghan Star.

== Activism ==
Sayeed was a supporter of the #WhereIsMyName campaign led by Laleh Osmany, which brought about a change in Afghan law so that women's names could be included on identity cards.

Aryana Sayeed expresses patriotism for Afghanistan and a fondness for India, which she stated is a "true friend" to Afghanistan.

Aryana had the honour of performing at UNESCO’s 75th Anniversary Celebration in Paris, France representing Afghanistan in the presence of multiple presidents and Prime Ministers of various countries. Aryana dedicated her performance to Afghanistan and all those who have lost their homes and are living a life of exile in other countries.

== Personal life ==
Sayeed got engaged to her manager, Hasib Sayed, in 2018.

In August 2021, following the fall of Kabul to the Taliban, she was evacuated from Kabul to Doha, Qatar on an American military flight. As of 25 August 2021, she was reported to be living in Los Angeles, California in the United States.

Her niece Nadia Nadim, who was only 11 when she fled to Denmark with her family as a refugee, plays for the Denmark national football team.
