= Shakeeb Hamdard =

Singer from Afghanistan

Shakeeb Hamdard شکیب همدرد
- Also known as: Ahmad Shakeeb; Shakeeb
- Born: Ahmad Shakeeb; 1984 (age 40–41); Chahar Deh, Kabul, Afghanistan
- Origin: Hazaristan, Afghanistan
- Genres: Pop, Folk
- Occupation: Singer
- Years active: 2005–present

Shekeb Hamdard (Persian: شكیب همدرد), born as Ahmad Shekeb, is a well-known singer from Afghanistan. He is ethnically Hazara and currently continues his music career in the United States. He is the first winner of Afghan Star, a reality TV show in Afghanistan.

== Early life ==
He migrated to Pakistan at an early age due to the civil war. After the September 11 attacks, under the new Afghan government, he returned and joined Habibia High School of Kabul.

== Career ==
Hamdard's musical career started after he won the first-ever musical reality TV show in 2005. The Afghan Star is the Afghan version of American Idol which is broadcast by Tolo TV with the financial support of Roshan Telecommunications. After the show, a super hit single Gul Dana Dana was on market by Shakeeb Hamdard. Later, he signed up with Bardburd Music which released his first album Mashallah.

== Personal life ==
He lives in Jacksonville, Florida, United States. Shakeeb Hamdard belongs to Hazara ethnic group.

== Discography ==
- 2007: Mashallah

== See also ==
- Afghan Star
- List of Hazara people
