= ATN Awards =

Afghan Music Award

The ATN Awards is an annual music award ceremony held by Ariana Television Network. Viewers cast votes via SMS and online. Bassir Bayat is the executive producer of ATN Awards along with his team in Afghanistan, India, the United States and the UAE.
