= Afghan Star =

Afghan reality television show

- Afghan Star logo
- Also known as: Sitara-e Afghan
- Created by: TOLO
- Presented by: Dawood Sediqui (S1–3); Omid Nezami (S4–7, & 12); Mustafa Azizyar (S8–11 & 13–present); Mozhdah Jamalzadah (S7 & 9); Co-Hosted by: Ahmad Popal (S8); Sajid Janati (S9–10); Hesam Farzan (S11–14); Sahar Safdari (S15)
- Theme music composer: Qais Ulfat, Wahid Qasemi, Jawad Karimi
- Country of origin: Afghanistan
- Original language: Dari Persian
- No. of seasons: 15
- No. of episodes: 29/Season

Production
- Production location: Kabul

Original release
- Network: TOLO
- Release: September 2005 – 2021

Afghan Star is a reality television show competition that searched for the most talented singers across Afghanistan. The program was broadcast on the TOLO channel. Afghan Star premiered in 2005, four years after the fall of the Taliban, which had outlawed singing in 1996, and ended after fifteen seasons in 2021 after the Taliban regained power and banned music. It was one of the most-watched shows in Afghanistan.

== Format ==
The format of Afghan Star was similar to the British Pop Idol or the French Nouvelle Star and their many spinoffs, though it was independently produced and not a licensed adaptation. The program started with auditions from aspiring singers in their late teens and early 20s. A panel of judges chose the best auditionees and put them through to the public voting round of the contest. At this stage, each week every singer performed and the viewers used their cell phones to vote for which singer they prefer. In every round whoever got the fewest votes left the competition until just one was left, who was declared the winner.

== Seasons ==
=== Season 1 ===
The first season of Afghan Star launched in September 2005, with more than 1,000 hopefuls from around Afghanistan gathering to partake in the talent search. The eventual winner of the series was Shakeeb Hamdard from Kabul, who released his debut album Mashalla in late 2007.

=== Season 2 ===
Afghan Star season two started in August 2006 with auditions in Kabul, Mazar, Herat, Kandahar, Jalalabad and Peshawar in neighboring Pakistan. The talent net was widened with Afghans from Pakistan and Iranian Afghans in Iran encouraged to participate.

The second Afghan Star was more successful than the first, with Najibullah Mahmoudi a 35-year-old man from Mazar-i-Sharif, voted as the winner. He later signed a recording contract with Barbud Music, the same label that released Shakeeb Hamdard's music.

=== Season 3 ===
The third season of Afghan Star debuted in October 2007. Auditions were held for the first time in Kunduz and Ghazni as well as the cities visited in previous series. At this stage, Afghan Star became one of the most watched and talked about shows on Afghan television, regularly attracting 11 million viewers per episode. The high profile of the show meant heightened security was introduced around the studios and contestants of the show.

The eventual winner of the third series of Afghan Star was Rafi Naabzada, who was the second winner from Mazar-i-Sharif, Balkh.

=== Season 4 ===
The fourth season of Afghan Star debuted in December 2008. Changes to the format of the show were introduced, including an extra spin-off show broadcast per week.

The ultimate winner of the season was Navid Forogh from Kabul. The runner-up was Mehran Gulzar and the contestant who was second runner-up was Navid Saberpoor.

=== Season 5 ===
Afghan Star's fifth season started airing in October 2009, concluding in December of the same year. Auditions were conducted from all the cities visited in previous seasons. However, Nazir Khara and Monesa Sherzada-Hassan (the first and only female judge at the time) did not return to the judging panel for this series. Instead, Ahmad Fanos became a new judge.

Wali Sazesh, a student from Herat was the winner of the series.

=== "Superstar Season 1" ===
A special spin-off edition, named "Superstar", was the first Superstar season of Afghan Star, which aired in 2010. The series only featured contestants from previous seasons of Afghan Star. The eventual winner of the contest was crowned the "Superstar" of all Afghan Stars.

The contestants were led by two coaches, Ahmad Fanus and Nazir Khara, who each had 6 contestants in their teams.

The winner of the season was Siyar Walizada (team Ahmad Fanus) from the first season of Afghan Star, and second place went to Sharif Deedar (team Nazir Khara) from second season of Afghan Star.

=== Season 6 ===
The sixth season debuted on 2 November 2010. The season was won by Omid Altaf. The prize for the winner was a new Nissan car.

=== Season 7 ===
The seventh season premiered on 4 November 4, 2011. The season was won by Reza Rezai, the second runner-up was Mateen Alokozai and the second runner-up was Almas Farahi.

The prize for the winner was a new red Toyota Corolla, the second prize was a Pamir motorcycle, and the third prize was another motorcycle. The judges of the season were Qasim Ramishgar, Wajia Rastagar, and Ustad Arman. The music director was Farid Rastagar.

=== Season 8 ===
The eighth season debuted on 2 November 2012. In this season, all the judges and host were new. The judges were Wali Fateh Ali Khan, Shahlah Zaland, and Jawad Ghaziyar and the host was Mustafa Azizyar. The music director was Ahmad Jawad Karimi.

There were many disputes between the judges, which attracted many viewers. Ramishgar returned later on. The winner of this season was Sajid Hussain Jannaty. Second place went to Haroon Andeshwar, and the runner up was Jamshid Sakhi.

=== Season 9 ===
The ninth season debuted on 1 November 2013. The host of the previous season, Mustafa Azizyar, continued to host the show. Qasem Rameshgar returned as one of the judges and the other two, Wali Fateh Ali Khan and Shahlah Zaland, were the same as the previous season. The guest judge was Tahir Shubab. The new music director was Wahid Qasemi. The previous winner, Sajid Janaty, replaced Ahmad Popal as the host of Ba Setara Ha.

The overall winner was Rabiullah Behzad, a student training to become a doctor. Second place went to Nayeb Nayab from Farah. Third place went to Arash Barez.

=== Season 10 ===
The 10th season debuted on October 31, 2014. The judges were the same except Wali Fateh Ali Khan was replaced by Ustad Sharif Ghazal. During the Top 160, Shadkam arrived as the new guest judge of the show. The show concluded on March 21, 2015, with Ali Saqi being crowned as the winner. Second place was Panjshanbe Maftoon, the student of the famous mahali singer Mir Maftoon. Third place went to Elyas Isaar. The show courted some controversy when contestant Hasher Ehsas was accused by District Unknown of plagiarising their song, "Two Seconds After The Blast", in a Wild Card Show on February 13, 2015.

=== "Superstar Season 2" ===
The second season of the spin-off Superstar (Abarsetara) debuted in May 2015. The season was hosted by Arash Barez, and there was a total of 12 contestants from 10 previous seasons.

The format of show was like a battle show with two coaches Obaid Juenda and Qais Ulfat. Each coach had 6 contestants in their teams. In the top 6, there were no teams and a new judge Wahid Kacemey came into play. Also, the two coaches became judges.

The winner of season was Omid Parsa from Season 4 of Afghan Star. Second place went to Elyas Issar from the most recent season of Afghan Star (Season 10). Both finalists were from team Obaid Juenda. The prize for winner was a new Chevrolet car and one audio album recording with Barbud Music, as well as two music videos in the same studio.

=== Season 11 ===
Season 11 of Afghan Star debuted on 30 October 2015. Three of the four judges this season were replaced with the judges that were previously on The Voice of Afghanistan, Qais Ulfat, Aryana Sayeed, and Obaid Juenda. The fourth judge was Saida Gul Maina.

For the first time, Afghan Star had auditions outside of Afghanistan and Pakistan, which were in Australia for one episode.

Ahmad Popal replaced Sajid Janati for the host of Ba Setara Ha for a brief period, but Popal was replaced by Season 9 and Superstar Season 2 contestant Hesam Farzan.

For the first time, a rapper, Ziba Hamidi, made the show's top 12 of the voting segment in the show. Like the previous years, the show was concluded on Nowruz, on 20 March 2016, with this year's winner, Habibullah Fani, from Mazar-i-Sharif. Second place went to Ashkan Arab, a contestant from Herat. Third place went to Rashed Aria. Unlike the prior seasons, the winner was simply awarded a trophy.

=== Season 12 ===
The show returned to its 12th season on 4 November 2016. The judges from Season 11 returned to the show. The host from season 8 to season 11, Mustafa Azizyar, was replaced by Omid Nezami, who hosted the show last time in Season 7.

This season had some new and talented contestants, such as Sayid Jamal Mubariz (a rapper), Khalil Yousefi, a singer with 15 years of experience, Shaqayeq Roya, a contestant born in Iran, as well as many others.

The contestants who made to the top 3 were awarded a trip to Almaty, Kazakhstan, and they were Sayid Jamal Mubariz, Zulala Hashemi, and Babak Mohammadi. The winner was awarded a motorcycle from Pamir Motorcycle. For the first time since the show's inception, a female contestant to make the show's Top 2, specifically Zulala Hashemi. This marked the farthest a woman had made in this show, beating the previous record which was held by Lema Sahar when she made the top 3 in Season 3. Also for the first time in the show's history, a rapper (Sayid Jamal Mubariz) made the show's final. Mubariz became the second rapper to make it into the show's top 12, with performances that were praised by the judges each week.

As it was customary with the previous seasons, the Grand Finale was hosted on Nowroz day, on 21 March 2017. Sayid Jamal Mubariz finished first, becoming the first rapper to do so, with Zulala Hashemi finishing second, making her the farthest placed female contestant. The top 3 contestants were awarded various prizes, with Mubariz winning the motorcycle, Hashemi winning an air conditioner and water dispenser, and top 3 finalists, Mubariz, Hashemi, and Babak Mohammadi winning a week long trip to Almaty, Kazakhstan. After being declared the winner, Mubariz decided to give the trophy to Hashemi, due to her placement in the show, as well as showing respect for women in Afghanistan, due to the dangers and hardships they face everyday in the country.

=== Season 13 ===
The show returned to its 13th season, three of the judges from season 12 returned to the show except Aryana Sayeed. Her spot was replaced by Shahla Zaland.

This season, the top 12 contestants were all male and this season brought some new and talented contestants, such as Reshad Nahir and Mansoor Jalal. As it was customary with the previous seasons, the grand finale was hosted on Nowruz day. On that day, Mustafa Hoonarjoo finished first, winning the grand finale.

=== Season 14 ===
Season 14 of Afghan Star was historical. A diverse group of twelve talented artists from across Afghanistan made their way to the show after being juried by Miri Maftun, Qais Ulfat and Saida Gul Maina. In this season, out of the twelve contestants, two of them were female. Sediqa Madadgar from Kabul and Zahra Elham from Ghazni province were two of the female contestants participating in the show.

The overall format of the season was that the contestant with the majority of the votes from the public will be moved forward in the show. Sediq Madadgar got up to the seventh round of the show. In this season, Wasim Anwari, Firuz Fazel and Zahra Elham made it to top three.

During the history of Afghan Star, which is in the last 14 years, all the winners were male. Therefore, this season marked the first time that an eighteen-year-old woman, Zahra Elham, won the competition. Elham gained the majority of the votes from the public, inside and outside the country. Furthermore, she is of Hazara ethnicity, which is a minority in the country. Her hometown, Ghazni, was sieged by the Taliban in August 2018, displacing thousands of Hazaras. She has also been an activist for women rights, whilst some Afghan men and the Taliban are against women's participation in singing and dancing competition. She referenced those men during the show by asking people to vote for her to give a slap in the faces of jealous men or men who are against women's freedom. She was on a mission to break down the records of male winners. In her interview with Al-Jazeera TV, Zahra mentions that both of her parents supported her dream to become a pop singer. This narrative goes against many stories about Afghan girls not having the freedom or the right to do what they like. By gaining the majority of the vote from the people, her success demonstrates that the people of Afghanistan support female participation in Afghan Star. She attributes her success to all the women in Afghanistan by saying that: "I am so so happy, I cannot even find words to express my feelings... Today, I represent all the girls of Afghanistan. Today not only Zahra Elham but all the girls in Afghanistan have won."

=== Season 15 ===
The show returned to its 15th season, Saidagul Maina and Mir Maftoon returned in their places as judges, Hangama and Shekib Mossadeq joined them in two remaining spots. This season featured Fahim Fana, he was the first contestant singing in Qawali genre in Afghan Star history, and eventually the season was won by him while Mujtaba Khawari took the 2nd place.

=== "Superstar Season 3" ===
The third season of the spin-off Superstar (Abarsetara) was to be aired in May 2020, but due to the COVID-19 pandemic, the show was postponed to January 2021. The season was hosted by Mustafa Azizyar, and there was a total of 10 contestants from 5 previous seasons (S11-15) of Afghan Star.

The format of show was a battle show with two coaches, Aryana Sayeed and Qais Ulfat. Each coach had 5 contestants on their team. A new feature was introduced in this season called the Golden Buzzer, which gave the coaches the power to keep one of their favorite contestants from elimination. Aryana Sayeed used it for Khalil Yosufi when he was eliminated for 3rd position, while Qais Ulfat's Buzzer chance remained unused till the end.

This season had a lot of controversy, quarrels between the two most favorite contestants, Fahim Fana and Jamal Mubarez, while Aryana Sayeed the coach of Jamal Mubarez, became verbally abusive towards Fahim Fana which caused Fahim Fana to leave the show a few weeks before the finals.

The two finalists were Mansour Jalal (Team Qais) and Jamal Mubarez (Team Aryana) which at the end the season was won by Jamal Mubarez.

== Season details ==
Season	Year	Winner	Runner Up	Judges	Host	Wild Card	Ref.
1	2005–06	Shakeeb Hamdard	Abdulsami Yosufzai	Tooryalai Tapesh, Hanif Hamgam, Jalil Sadid	Dawood Sediqui	N/A	
2	2006–07	Najeebullah Mahmoodi	Sorush Nawa	Ustad Gulzaman, Mrs Monesa, Jalil Sadid	Dawood Sediqui	N/A	
3	2007–08	Rafi Naabzada	Hameed Sakhizada	Ustad Gulzaman, Nazir Khara, Mrs Monesa, Baryalai Wali	Dawood Sediqui	N/A	
4	2008-09	Naweed Forugh	Mehran Gulzar	Ustad Gulzaman, Qasem Rameshgar, Mrs Monesa	Omid Nezami	Mehran Gulzar	
5	2009–10	Wali Sazesh	Habibullah Shubab	Ustad Gulzaman, Qasem Rameshgar, Ahmad Fanoos	Omid Nezami	Abdullah Meelad Kabiri	
6	2010–11	Omid Altaf	Munir Shadmaan	Ustad Gulzaman, Qasem Rameshgar, Nazir Khara	Omid Nezami	Saraj Popal	
7	2011–12	Reza Rezayee	Matin Alkozai	Qasem Rameshgar, Ahmad Wali Fateh Ali Khan, Wajiha Rastagar, Ustad Armaan	Omid Nezami and Mozhdah Jamalzadah	Almaas Farahi	
8	2012–13	Sajid Hussain Jannati	Haroon Andeshwar	Qasem Rameshgar, Ahmad Wali Fateh Ali Khan, Shahla Zaland, Jawad Ghaziyaar	Mustafa Azizyar	Sajid Hussain Jannati	
9	2013–14	Rabiullah Behzaad	Nayeb Nayab	Qasem Rameshgar, Ahmad Wali Fateh Ali Khan, Shahla Zaland, Tahir Shabab	Mustafa Azizyar	Anahita Ulfat	
10	2014-15	Ali Saqi	Panjshanbe Maftoon	Qasem Rameshgar, Sharif Ghazal, Shahla Zaland, Ustad Shaadkaam	Mustafa Azizyar	Elyas Essar	
11	2015-16	Habibullah Fani	Ashkaan Arab	Aryana Sayeed, Obaid Joyendeh, Qais Ulfat, Saidagul Maina	Mustafa Azizyar	Habibullah Fani	
12	2016-17	Jamal Mubarez	Zulala Hashemi	Aryana Sayeed, Obaid Joyendeh, Qais Ulfat, Saidagul Maina	Omid Nezami	Babak Muhammdi	
13	2017-18	Mustafa Honarjo	Mansoor Jalal	Shahla Zaland, Obaid Joyendeh, Qais Ulfat, Saidagul Maina	Mustafa Azizyar	Reshad Nahib	
14	2018-19	Zahra Elham	Wasim Anwari	Aryana Sayeed, Qais Ulfat, Saidagul Maina, Miri Maftun	Mustafa Azizyar	Feroz Fazel	
15	2019-20	Fahim Fana	Mujtaba Khaawari	Hangama, Shekib Mossadeq, Saidagul Maina, Miri Maftun and (Miri Maftun replaced Tala Mohammad Takhari)	Mustafa Azizyar	Shekib Ghausi	

== Superstar ابرستاره ==
Season	Year	Winner	Runner Up	Team Leaders	Host	Wild Card	Ref.
1	2010	Siyar Walizada (Team Ahmad Fanoos)	Sharif Deedar (Team Nazir Khara)	Ahmad Fanoos and Nazir Khara	Mustafa Sufi	Masoud Hamnawa	
2	2015	Omid Parsa (Team Obaid Joyendah)	Elyas Essar (Team Obaid Joyendah)	Obaid Joyendeh and Qais Ulfat	Aarash Barez	Jamshed Sakhi	
3	2020-21	Jamal Mubarez (Team Aryana)	Mansour Jalal (Team Qais)	Aryana Sayeed and Qais Ulfat	Mustafa Azizyar	Khalil Yosufi (Golden Buzzer)	

== Judges and hosts ==
The judging panel and the host of the show have changed over the years, including:

- Ustad Gulzaman has been a judge on Afghan Star since season one. He is renowned in the music industry in Afghanistan specialising in Pashto songs, and has been recognised as an Ustad in music. He is also an accomplished composer and poet.
- Qasem Rameshgar has been a judge on Afghan Star since season four. Born in Kabul, Qasem Rameshgar attended the Arts Faculty of Kabul University where he studied music. After graduation he went to Russia to study the guitar for 4 years, between 1992 and 1996. He is now the head of the Afghanistan Music Centre, after being involved in music for 27 years.
- Ahmad Fanos has been a judge on Afghan Star since season Five. Originally from Kabul city, Fanos gained a master's degree in communication from Saint Petersburg in Russia. He subsequently studied singing, and released the famous song "Zendage Shor-e-Nazanin Darad". He specialises in Ghazal songs.
- Omid Nezami participated in Season three of Afghan Star where he made the Top 12. During Season 4, Omaid acted as the co-host for Afghan Star conducting many of the behind the scenes interviews and discussions. However, he was promoted to centre stage as the main host of the series, as a result of previous host, Daoud Siddiqi's departure to the United States (See below). He returned as the main host of series five.
- Mustafa Azizyar is the current host of Afghan Star since Season 8. It is not known how long he will stay as the host.
- Sajid Janati is the former host of Ba Setara Ha or With the Stars. He was the host for Season 9 and 10. Janati was replaced by Ahmad Popal for Season 11, but Popal was soon replaced by Hesam Farzan.
- Wahid Qasemi is the music director of Afghan Star since Season 9. He also helps the Stars with improving their voice for their performances.

== Documentaries ==
In 2009, U.S. distributor Zeitgeist Films released a documentary film about the third season of Afghan Star. The British-produced film (directed by Havana Marking) won two awards at that year's Sundance Film Festival: World Cinema Audience Award: Documentary and World Cinema Directing Award: Documentary.

The previous host of the Afghan Star TV series, Daoud Sediqi, travelled to the United States in February 2009 as part of the promotion of the film worldwide. Sediqi did not return home to Afghanistan. He instead applied, and was subsequently granted asylum in the United States in June 2009. Previous to working on Afghan Star, Sediqi had been a DJ on Arman FM and a presenter on Tolo TV. He hosted all of Afghan Star's first three seasons, as well as the beginning of the fourth season, and was one of the most recognised names in the Afghan media at the time.

A second documentary about Afghan Star was released in 2022. Directed by Afghan-Canadian film maker Fazila Amiri, And Still I Sing was filmed during season 14 which had featured Zahra Elham as the show's first female winner. The documentary follows Elham and fellow finalist Sadiqa Madadgar as they are mentored by judge Aryana Sayeed, and the challenges to all the women as singers and performers from the return to power of the Taliban in Afghanistan in the aftermath of Elham's win. And Still I Sing was shown at film festivals worldwide and via streaming.

An eight-episode podcast series about the show (entitled Afghan Star) was released in 2024. The series was hosted by John Legend and produced by Kaleidoscope and iHeartRadio.

== See also ==
- TOLO (TV channel)
