= Mary Akrami =

Afghani activist

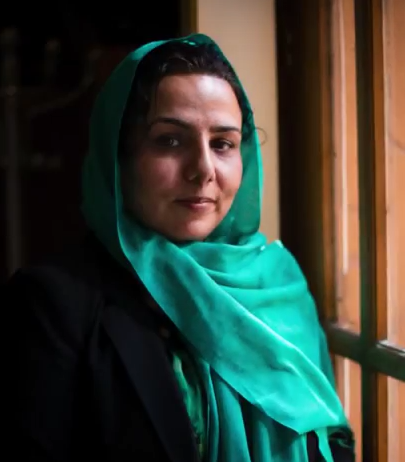
Mary Akrami in 2012

Mary Akrami (Persian: ماری اکرمی; 1975 or 1976 (age 48–49)) is the director of the Afghan Women Skills Development Center. She represented Afghan civil society at the 2001 Bonn Conference. In 2003 the Afghan Women Skills Development Center opened the first women's shelter in Kabul, Afghanistan. The shelter provides legal advice, literacy classes, psychological counseling, and basic skills training to women who need them. Akrami is on call 24 hours a day at the shelter, and under her leadership some of the women there have denounced their abusers publicly and filed court cases against them, something that had been almost unheard of in Afghanistan previously. She has faced threats for her work.

She received a 2007 International Women of Courage Award and was named in the BBC 100 Women 2016 list as one of the year's most inspirational and influential women.
