= Petros Tabouris =

Greek musician, composer and musicologist

Petros Tabouris (born 1964) (Greek: Πέτρος Ταμπούρης) is a Greek musician, composer, and musicologist, known for his contributions to the preservation and interpretation of ancient and traditional Greek music.

== Biography ==
Petros Tabouris was born in Athens in 1964 and studied both music and information technology (the latter at the National Technical University of Athens). From a very young age he showed an interest in Greek music and instruments used in popular music. After discovering Byzantine ecclesiastical music and the theory of Greek popular music, and meeting musicians, he became involved in composition and research.

== Works ==
In the 90s, Tabouris released many records in Greece and in Europe and has made a study of ancient and medieval/post-Byzantine music and instruments used in Greek popular music. He has experimented in the reproduction of ancient Greek instruments and their playing techniques. He has supervised series of digitally remastered 78 rpm recordings of Greek light music, rebetiko, Smyrna and folk songs, and has worked on recordings of traditional music of Balkan peoples and Greek folk songs.

At the same time, he has released his own songs to lyrics by Thodoris Gonis in two song cycles, and has set to music the poem "The Dodecalogue of the Gypsy" by Costis Palamas, His songs have been sung by Gerasimos Andreatos, Eleni Tsaligooulou, Eleftheria Arvanitaki, Anastasia Moutsatsou, Alexandros Hatzis, Costas Pavlidis and Christiana, among others.

He has played at concerts in Greece and abroad, appearing with the most famous Greek composers such as Yannis Markopoulos, Manos Hatzidakis and Nikos Xydakis. He composed a score to mark the 100th anniversary of the modern Olympic Games in 1996, presented at the Panathenaic Stadium in Athens and in Atlanta, and has also presented his work at concerts in Greece and abroad.

He has composed scores for plays in Greece, working mainly with state theatres on productions of ancient drama. Since 2000 he has been composing music for films and television in Brazil, Canada and the US.

He is the founder and director of the music group Melos Archaion, founded in 1996, which has n, and Poland), in the US, and in Australia.

His extensive work in the world music sphere is highlighted by his involvement in overseeing, collecting, and documenting audio and information for over 5000 world music albums, covering a wide range of genres and ethnicities.
