= Nordic folk music =

Music genre

Nordic folk music includes a number of traditions of Nordic countries, especially Scandinavian. The Nordic countries are Iceland, Norway, Sweden, Denmark and Finland.

The many regions of the Nordic countries share certain traditions, many of which have diverged significantly. It is possible to group together Finland, Estonia, Latvia and northwest Russia as sharing cultural similarities, contrasted with Norway, Sweden, Denmark and the Atlantic islands of Iceland and the Faroe Islands. Greenland's Inuit culture has its own musical traditions, influenced by Scandinavian culture. Finland shares many cultural similarities with both Baltics and the Scandinavian nations. The Saami of Sweden, Norway, Finland and Russia have their own unique culture, with ties to the neighboring cultures.

== Scandinavian music ==
The dulcimer and fiddle are the two most characteristic instruments found throughout Scandinavia. In Norway, the eight- or nine-stringed hardanger fiddle is also found. Gammaldans are a kind of dance song played by harmonica and accordion, popular in both Sweden and Norway in the late 19th and early 20th century.

Circle dancing while singing ballads is a historic part of the folk traditions of all of northern Europe. Only the Faroe Islands have maintained this tradition to the present day, though it has been revived in some other areas. Iceland is home to many ancient musical practices no longer found elsewhere in the Nordic area, such as the use of parallel fifths and organum.

Greenland's Inuit population has their own musical traditions, which have been melded with elements of Nordic music, such as the kalattuut style of Greenlandic polka.

Finland was long ruled by Sweden, so much of Finnish culture is influenced by Swedish. There are a number of Swedes living in Finland, and vice versa. These communities have produced traditional and neo-folk musicians like the Swedish-Finn Scea Jansson and Gjallarhorn, and the Finnish-Swedish Norrlåtar and JP Nyströms.

Baltic psalteries are a family of related plucked box zithers played throughout Finland (kantele), the Baltic states (kannel in Estonia, kanklės in Lithuania and kokles in Latvia respectively) and northwest Russia (krylovidnye gusli). A bowed lyre (Swedish tagelharpa, Estonian talharpa or hiiurootsi kannel, Finnish jouhikko or jouhikantele) was formerly played among Swedes living in Estonia, but usage declined until a recent revival. In the 19th century, all the Baltic states saw an influx of foreign instruments and styles, resulting in fusions like the zither kokles and German-influenced ziņģe singing style of Latvia.

== Sami music ==
The Sami are found in Norway, Sweden, Finland and the northwest corner of Russia. The only traditional Sami instruments are drums and the flute, though modern bands use a variety of instrumentation. Joiks, unrhymed works without definite structure, are the most characteristic kind of song.

== Balto-Finnic music ==
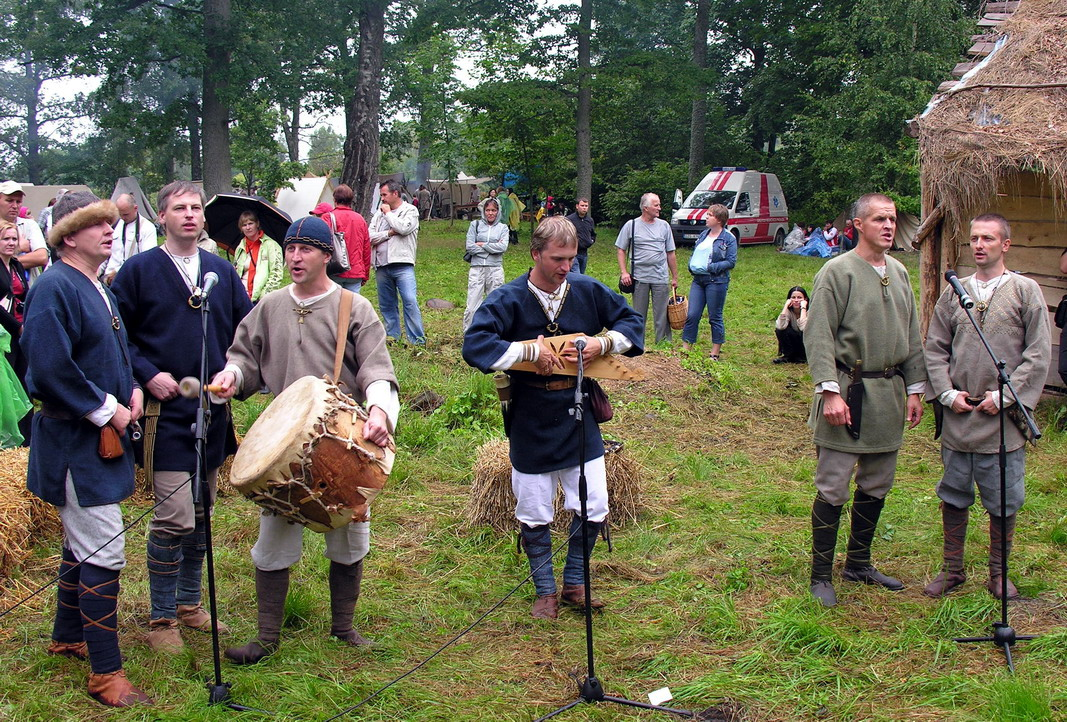
Latvian men's folk ensemble Vilki, performing at the festival of Baltic crafts and warfare Apuolė 854 in Apuolė Hillfort on August 2009

Balto-Finnic music is a category of music of Balto-Finnic people, that overlaps with both Nordic folk music of Nordic countries and Baltic folk music of Baltic states.

Finland's musical ties are primarily to the Balto-Finnic peoples of Russia and Estonia (Cronshaw, 91). Runic singing was practiced throughout the area inhabited by these peoples. Estonia and Finland both have national epics based on interconnected forms of runo-song, Kalevipoeg and Kalevala, respectively. "Estonian runic song has the same basic form as the Finnish variety to which it is related: the line has eight beats, the melody rarely spans more than the first five notes of a diatonic scale and its short phrases tend to use descending patterns" (Cronshaw, 16).

== Contemporary applications ==
In recent times Nordic folk music is used in developing the background score for movies, TV shows and games. Popular TV shows like Game of Thrones and games like God of War have used Nordic folk music to give a mythic experience.

== See also ==
- Neofolk
- Nordic popular music
