= Baltic psaltery =

Class of stringed musical instruments

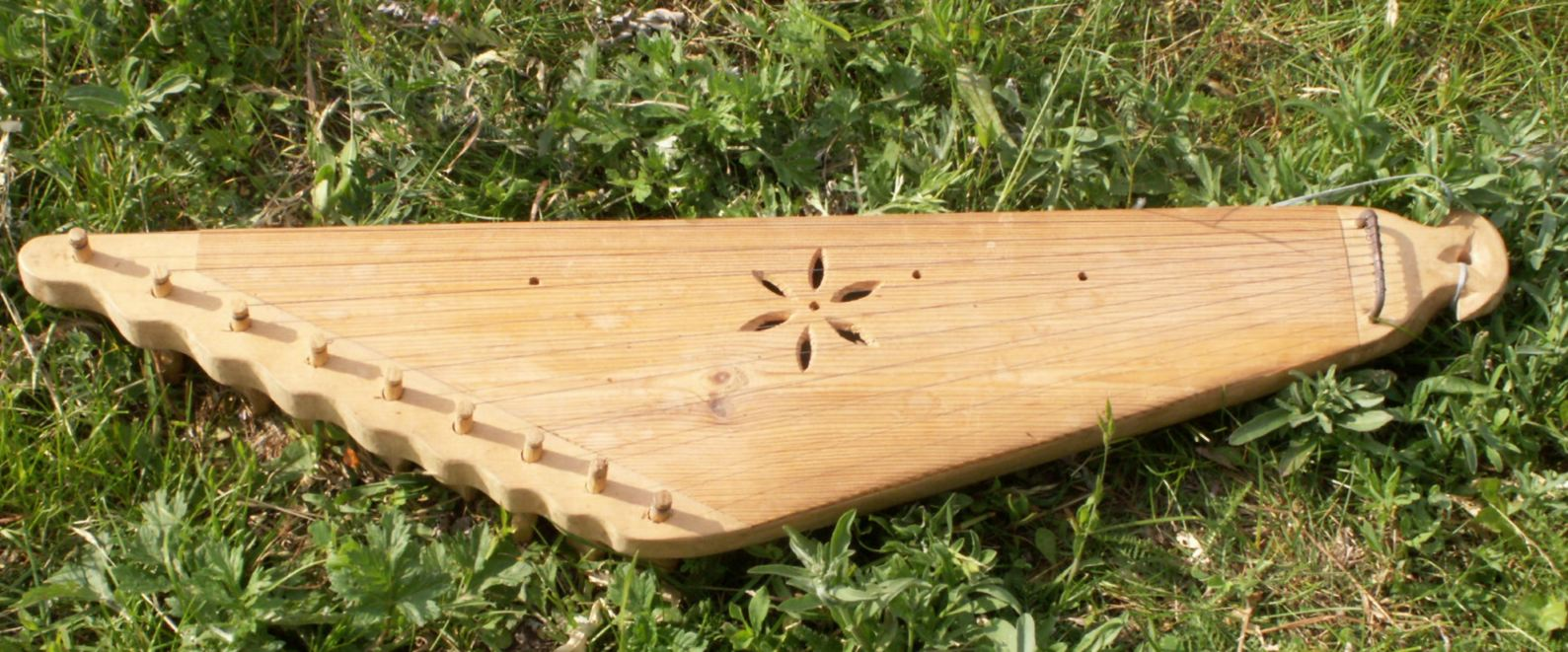
9-stringed kanklės of northeastern Aukštaitija

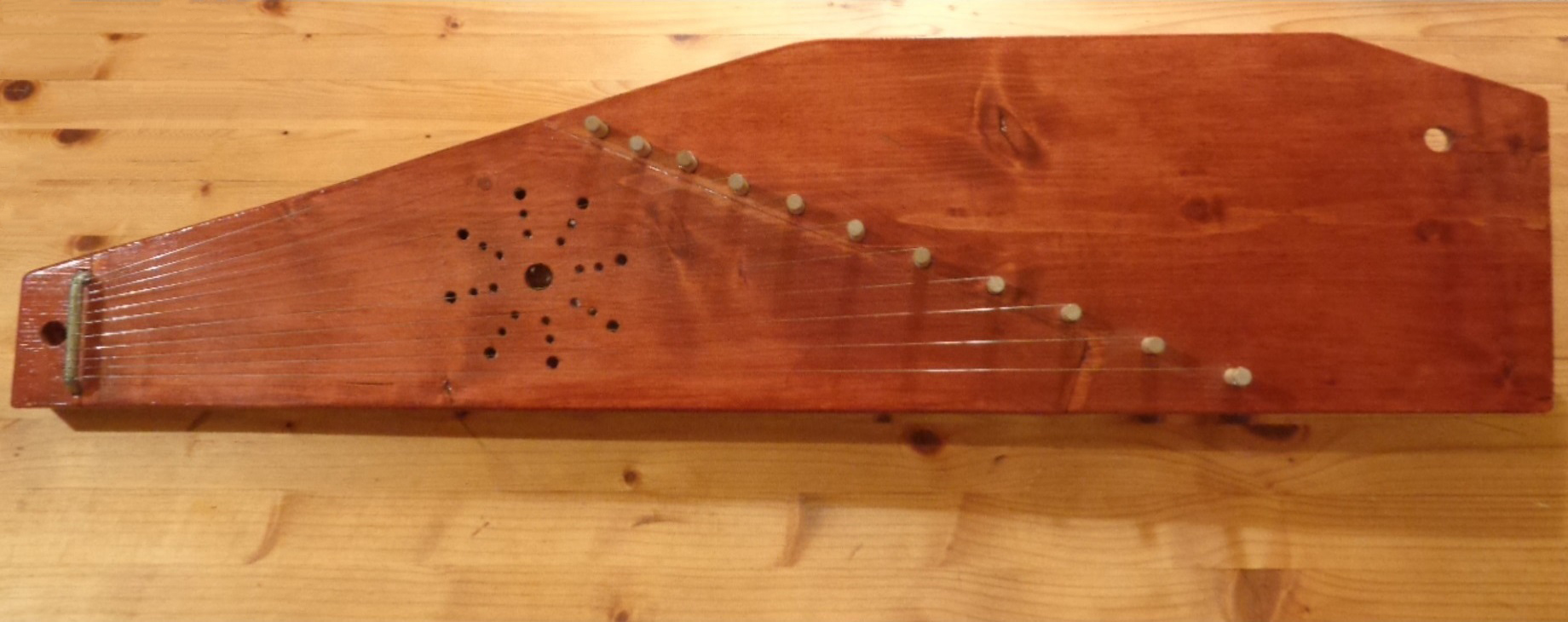
11-stringed Latgale kokles

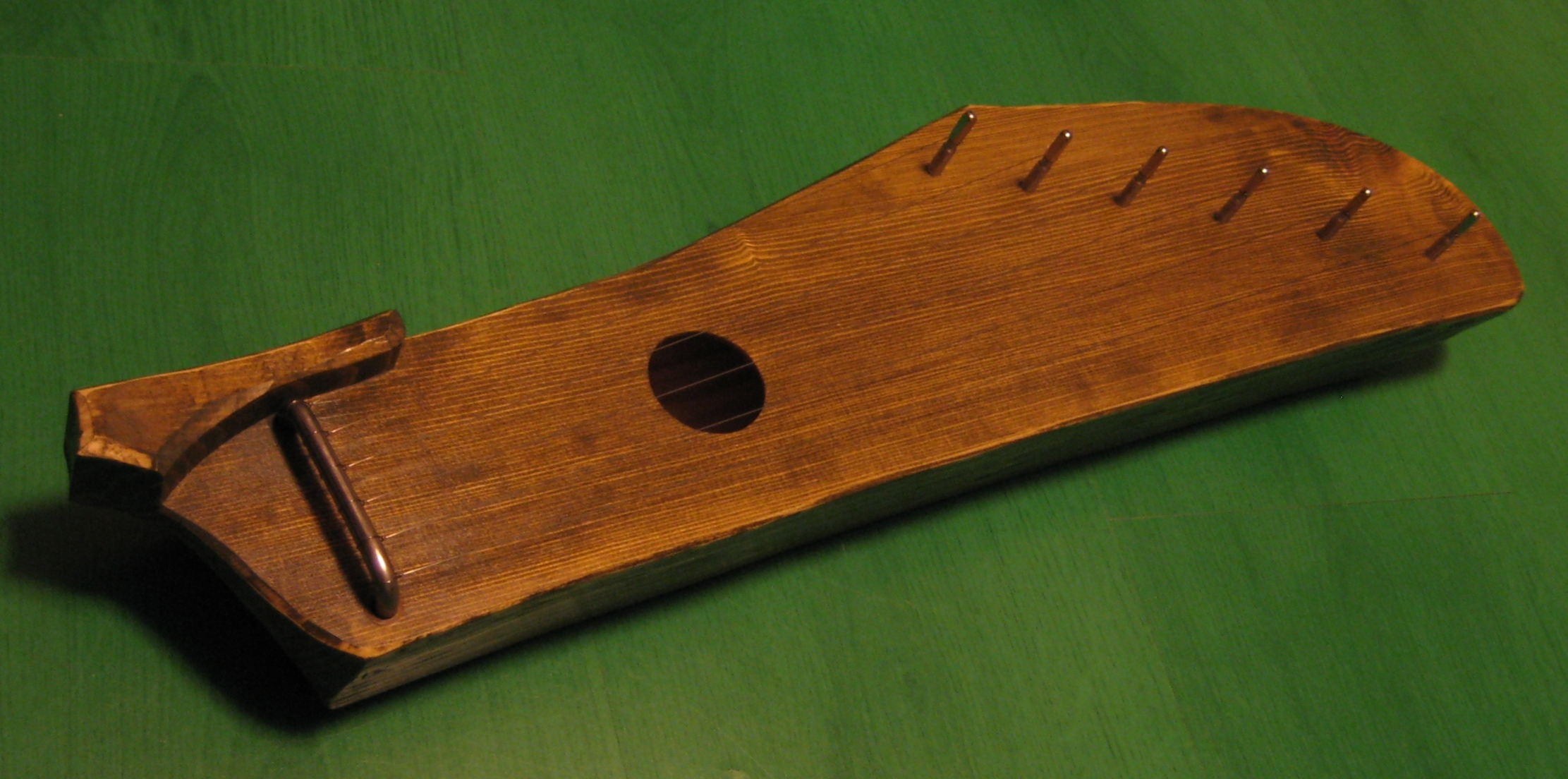
6-stringed kannel

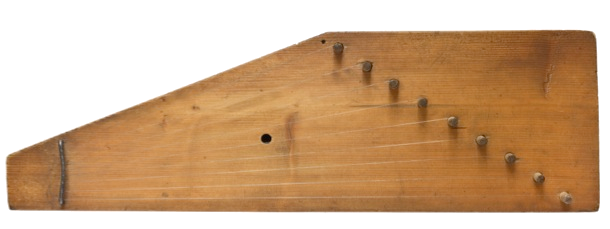
9-stringed krylovidnye gusli

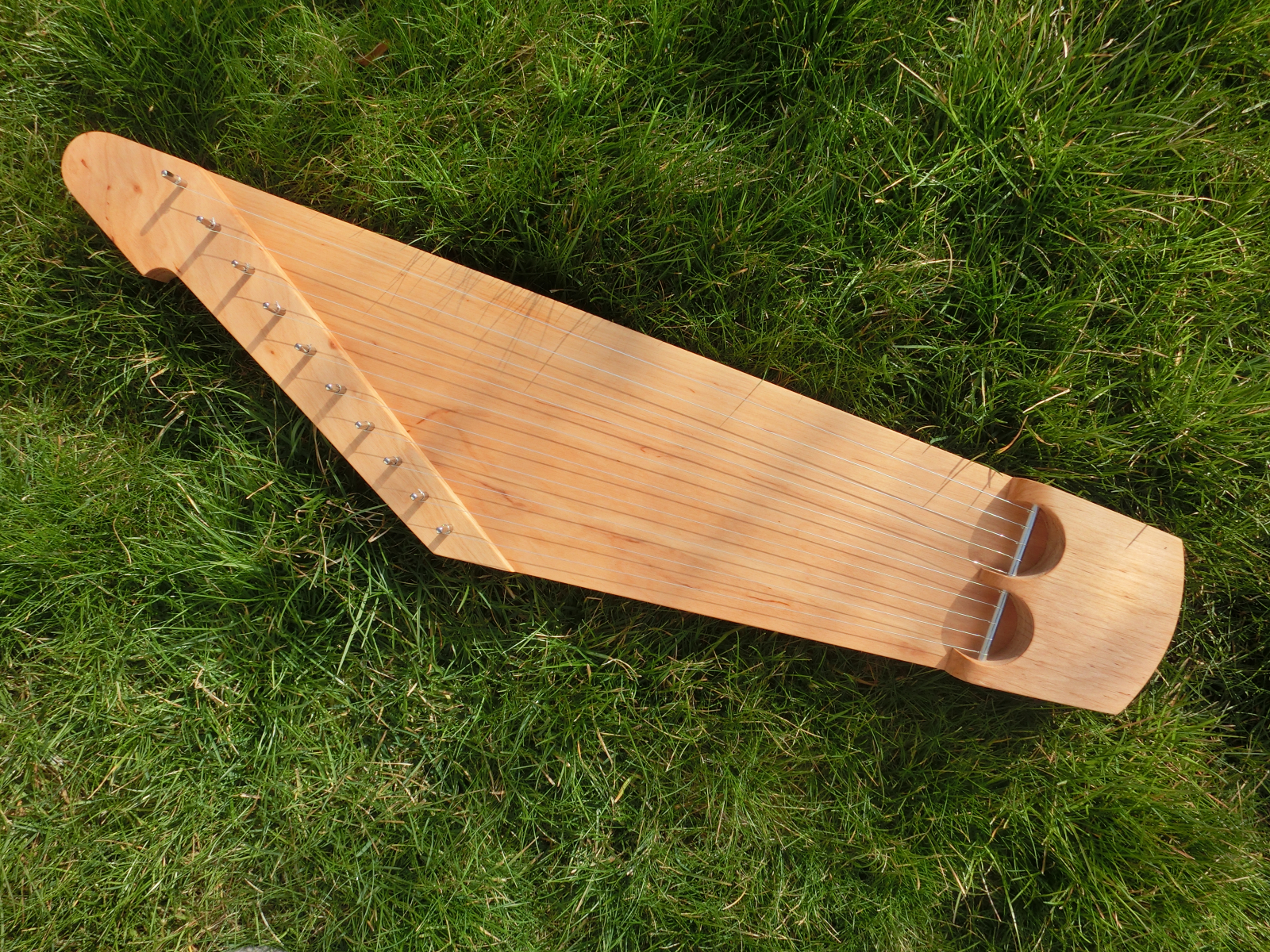
10-stringed Finnish kantele

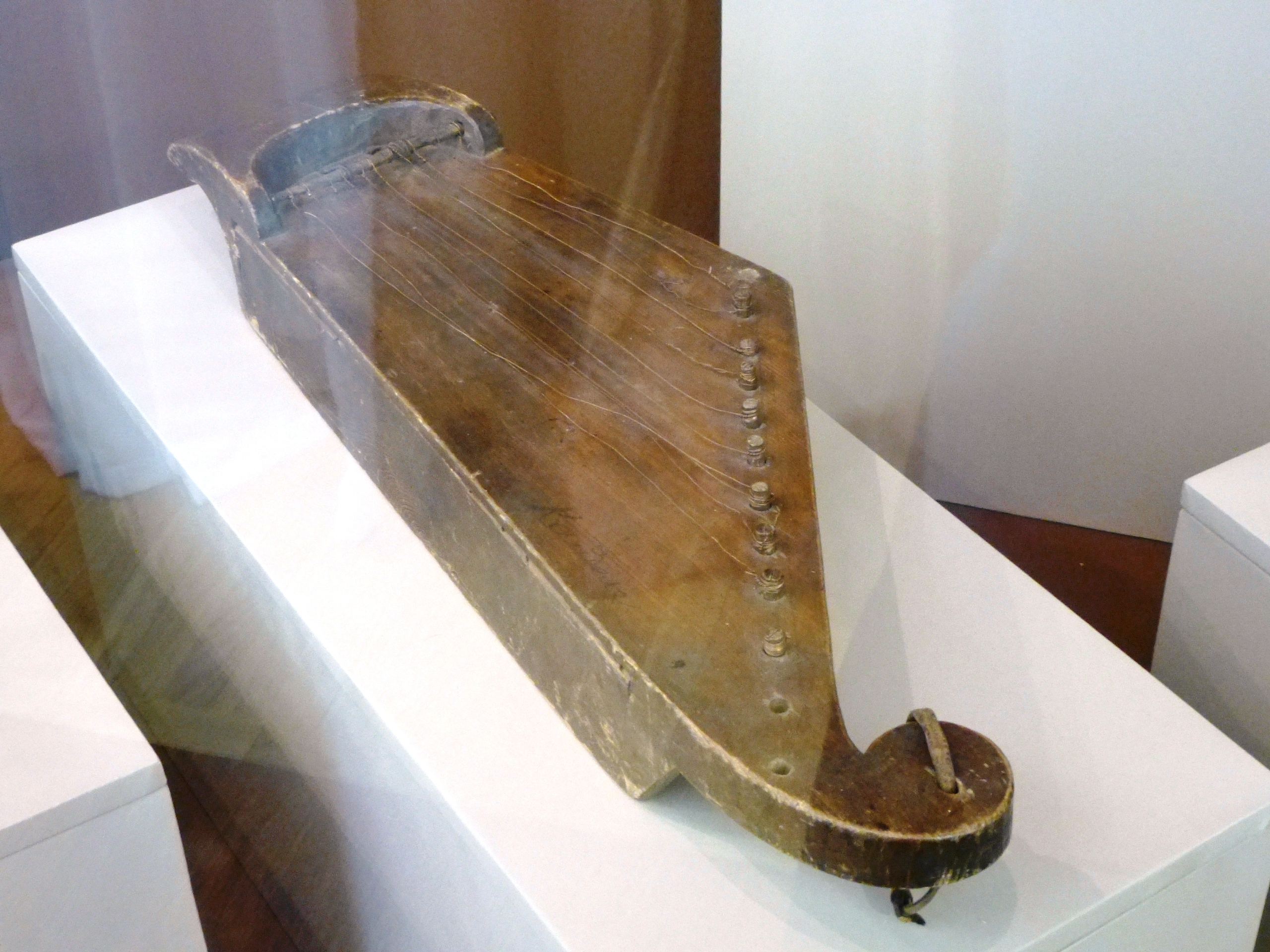
11-stringed Karelian kantele

Baltic psaltery is a family of related plucked box zithers, psalteries, historically found in the southeast vicinity of the Baltic Sea and played by the Baltic people, Baltic Finns, Volga Finns and northwestern Russians.

== Types ==
Baltic psalteries include:

- Kanklės (Lithuania)
- Kantele (Finland, Karelia and Northwest Russia)
- Kannel (Estonia)
- Kāndla (Livonian people of Northwest Latvia)
- Kokles (Latvia)
- Krez (Udmurt people of Central Russia)
- Krylovidnye gusli (Northwest Russia)
- Kusle (Mari people of Central Russia)
- Harpu (Sápmi)

The internationally most known instrument of the family is Finnish kantele, so its name is sometimes used in English to also refer to other Baltic psalteries as well. Many of the Baltic psalteries hold a strong symbolic significance in their respective countries, including Finland, Latvia, Lithuania, Estonia and Russia, where playing instruction and instrument makers are available.

== Etymology ==
According to Finnish linguist Eino Nieminen, the names kanklės, kantele, kannel, kāndla and kokles possibly come from the proto-Baltic form *kantlīs/*kantlēs, which originally meant 'the singing tree', ultimately deriving from the Proto-European root *qan- ('to sing, to sound'). However, Lithuanian ethnologist Romualdas Apanavičius believes they could be derived from the Proto-European root *gan(dh)-, meaning 'a vessel; a haft (of a sword)', suggesting that it may be related to the Russian word gusli.

== The Baltic Psaltery Symposia ==
Since 1990 Baltic Psaltery Symposia have taken place in Finland (1990; 1997; 2008), Lithuania (1994; 2017), Latvia (2000), Canada (2004) and Estonia (2013) every three or four years on a rotating basis.

== Bibliography ==
- Muktupāvels, Valdis (2013). The Baltic Psaltery and Playing Traditions in Latvia (2nd ed.). Riga: Lauska. ISBN 978-9934-8276-2-4.
