= Zigrida Ansamblis =

Australian musical group

- Origin: Brisbane, Queensland, Australia
- Genres: Folk
- Labels: Independent
- Members: Valda Biezaitis; Ance Deksne; Eliza Grant; Jasmine Lacis-Lee; Tija Lodins
- Past members: Zigrida Strazds
- Website: Official website

Zigrida Ansamblis (Zigrīda Ansamblis) is an Australian folk music band formed in Brisbane, Queensland. The ensemble makes extensive use of the kokles, a type of box zither, in their performances. Zigrida Ansamblis is particularly notable as the only currently active kokle ensemble in Australia.

Zigrida Ansamblis tracks have received airtime on ABC Classic FM, an Australia-wide national radio broadcast.

== Albums ==
- Pumpura iela: From Seed to Bloom (2006)
