= Kusle =

Mari plucked string instrument

String instrument
- Other names: karsh, kysle, kjusle and kiusle
- Classification: Chordophone
- Hornbostel–Sachs classification: 314.122-5 (Diatonic lute-type stringed instrument played using bare hands and fingers)

Related instruments
- Krez, gusli, kantele

Kusle (Meadow Mari: кӱсле; Northwestern Mari: кӹсле, кӹслӓ) or karsh (Meadow and Northwestern Mari: кӓрш) is a Mari plucked string instrument (chordophone). It has 12-20 strings and is shaped like a semi-circle. The instrument is played in the lap, with both hands, and was played on some occasions such as ritual sacrifices, and to accompany dancing. Kusle is described as resembling the Russian gusli or the Finnish kantele.

Organologist Anthony Baines noted in 1969, regarding the medieval Russian gusli: "...and the instrument has latterly been revived, notably in the Mari province by the Volga".

== See also ==
- Mari music
- Krez
