= Krez (instrument) =

Udmurt string instrument

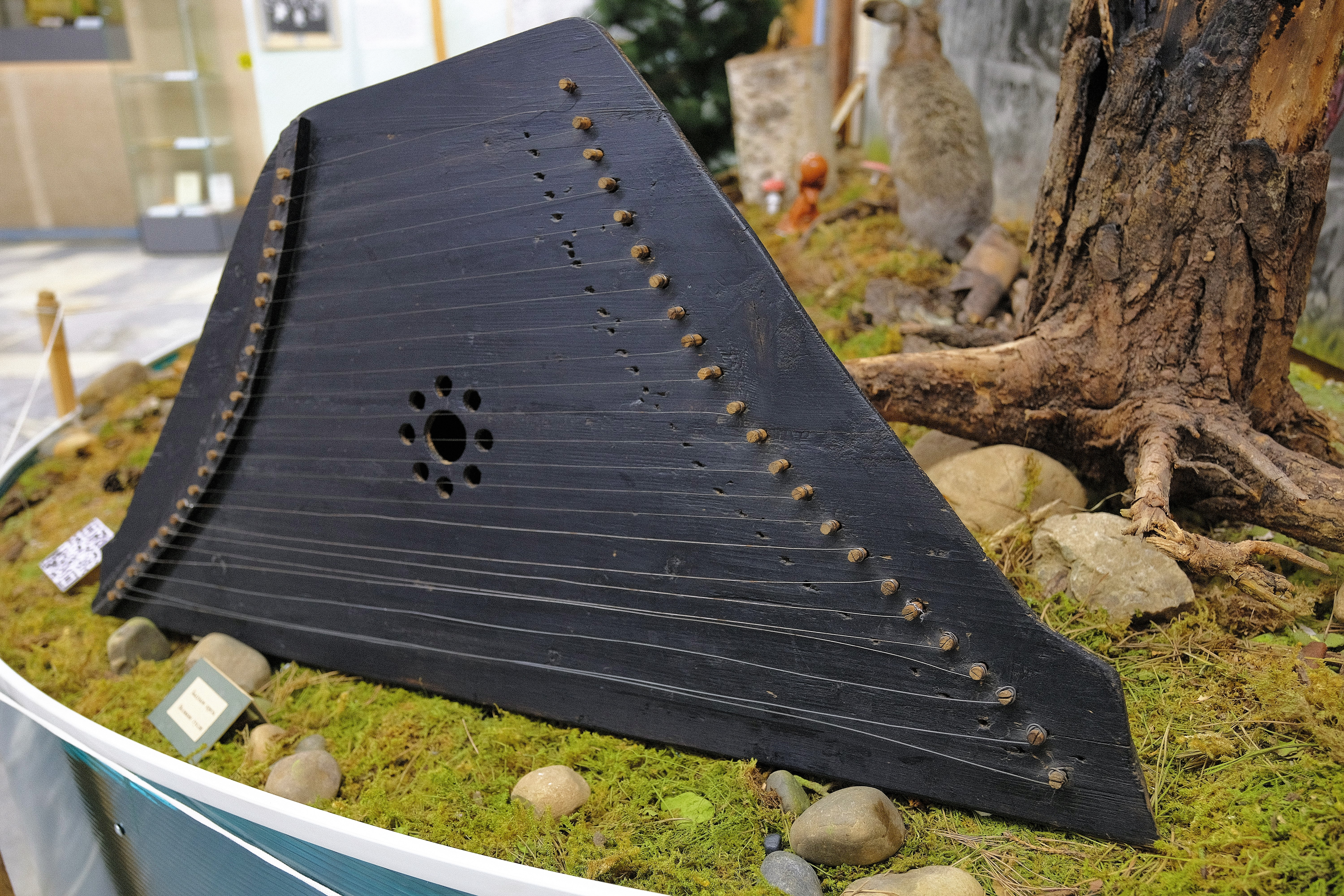
- A 23-string large krez at the Kuzebay Gerda's National Museum of Udmurt Republic

String instrument
- Other names: krez', krezh
- Classification: Chordophone
- Hornbostel–Sachs classification: 314.122-5 (Diatonic lute-type stringed instrument played using bare hands and fingers)

Related instruments
- Kusle, gusli, kantele

Krez (Udmurt and Russian: крезь) is an Udmurt string instrument (chordophone) similar to the Russian gusli. The mythical origin of krez is detailed in the Udmurt national epic, Dokjavyl. Krez was used to accompany some shamanic ritual dances, and large krez (быдӟым крезь) was used for music during the holiday of Bulda.

== See also ==
- Kusle
