= Kannel (instrument) =

Plucked string instrument native to Estonia

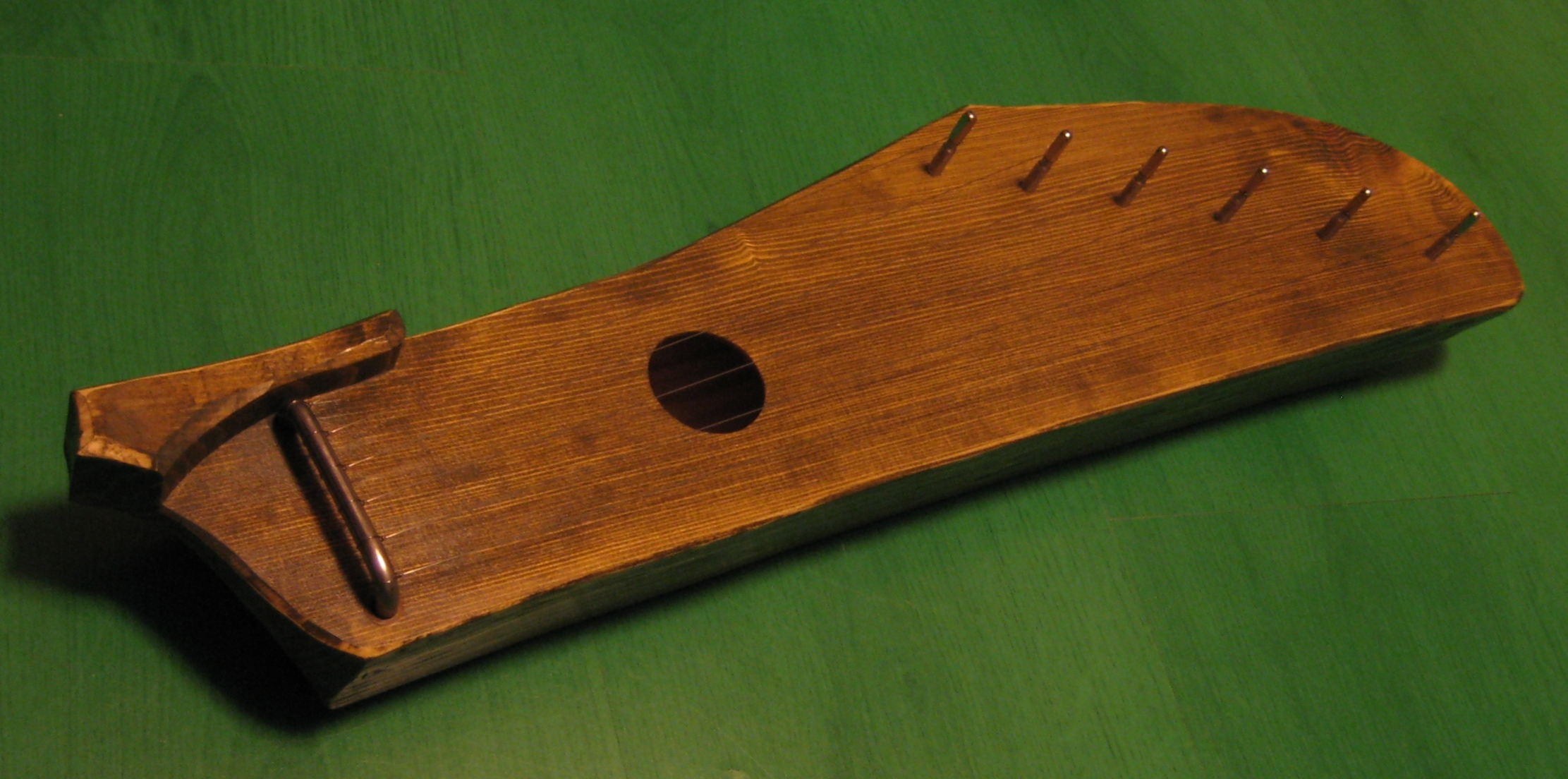
Traditional small 6-stringed kannel

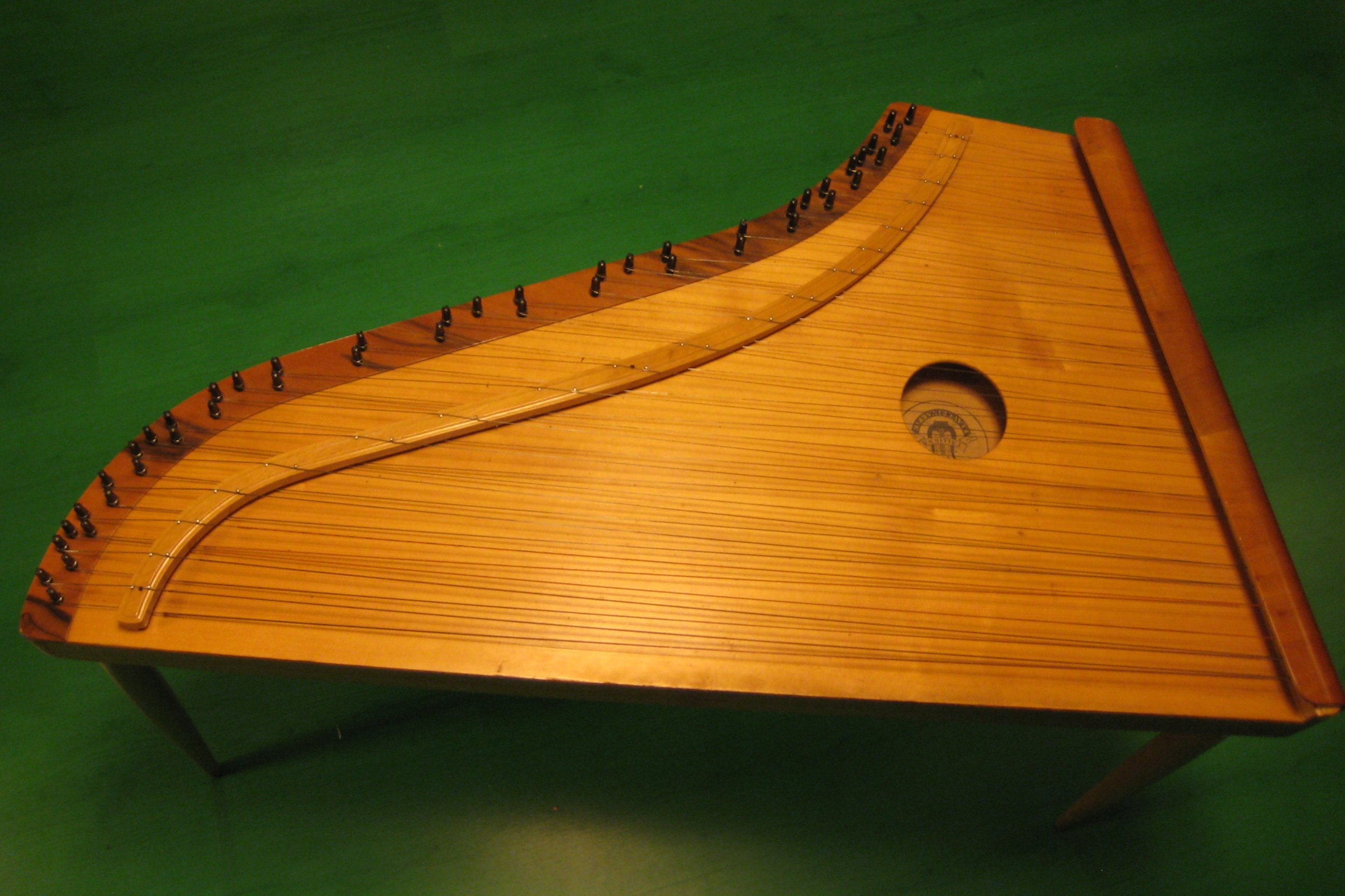
Large chromatic kannel from the Estonia Piano Factory in 1988

Kannel (pronounced [ˈkɑnːel]) is an Estonian plucked string instrument (chordophone) belonging to the Baltic box zither family known as the Baltic psaltery along with Finnish kantele, Latvian kokles, Lithuanian kanklės, and Russian gusli. The Estonian kannel has a variety of traditional tunings. In Estonia, studying the kannel has made a resurgence after some years of decline.

== Etymology ==
According to Finnish linguist Eino Nieminen, the name of the instrument, along with the names of most of its neighbouring counterparts (Finnish kantele, Livonian kāndla, Latvian kokles and Lithuanian kanklės), possibly comes from the Proto-Baltic form *kantlīs/*kantlēs, which originally meant 'the singing tree', ultimately deriving from the Proto-European root *kan- ('to sing, to sound'). However, Lithuanian ethnologist Romualdas Apanavičius believes kokles could be derived from the Proto-European root *gan(dh)-, meaning 'a vessel; a haft (of a sword)', suggesting that it may be related to the Russian word gusli.

== History ==
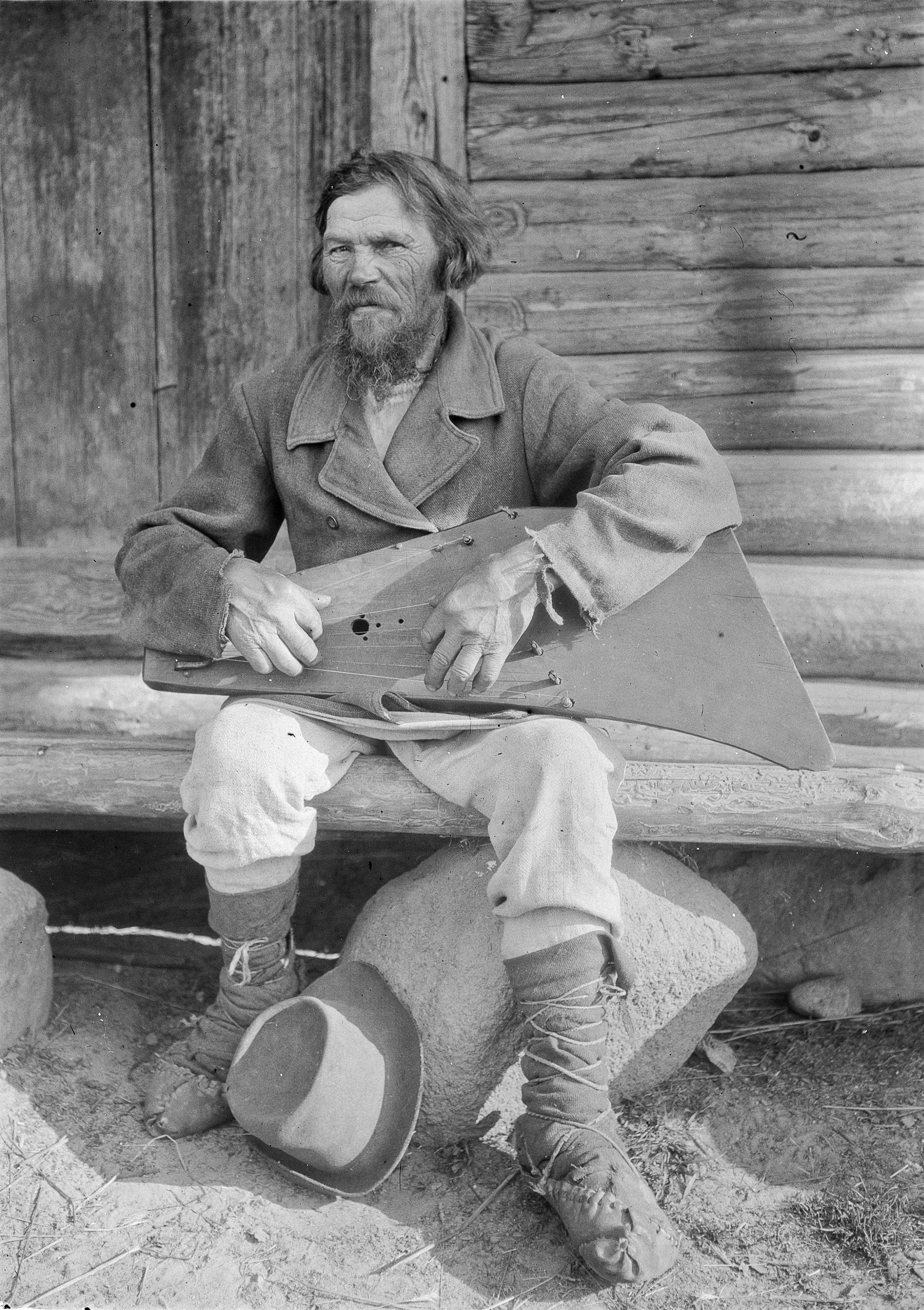
A kannel player in Järvepää, Setomaa, Estonia ca. 1912.

The kannel became rare in the early 20th century, though surviving in some parts of the Estonian diaspora, until cultural movements under the Soviets encouraged the development and playing of larger chromatic kannels. However, influence from neighboring traditional Finnish kantele players supported the playing of the traditional smaller kannels.

== Social role ==
A golden kannel pictured in the coat of arms of Petseri County

The kannel serves as a national symbol of Estonia; Jakob Hurt's 1875-1876 publication of Estonian folksongs was even titled Vana Kannel (The Old Kannel). The kannel was legendarily played by the Estonian god of song Vanemuine, and the Estonian national epic Kalevipoeg (published in the 1850s) begins with the line: Laena mulle kannelt, Vanemuine! ("Vanemuine, lend me your kannel!").

== Players ==
- Kristi Mühling
- Anna-Liisa Eller
- Mari Kalkun
- Eva Väljaots
- Duo Ruut

== See also ==
- Hiiu kannel, the Estonian bowed lyre
