= Kanklės =

Lithuanian musical instrument

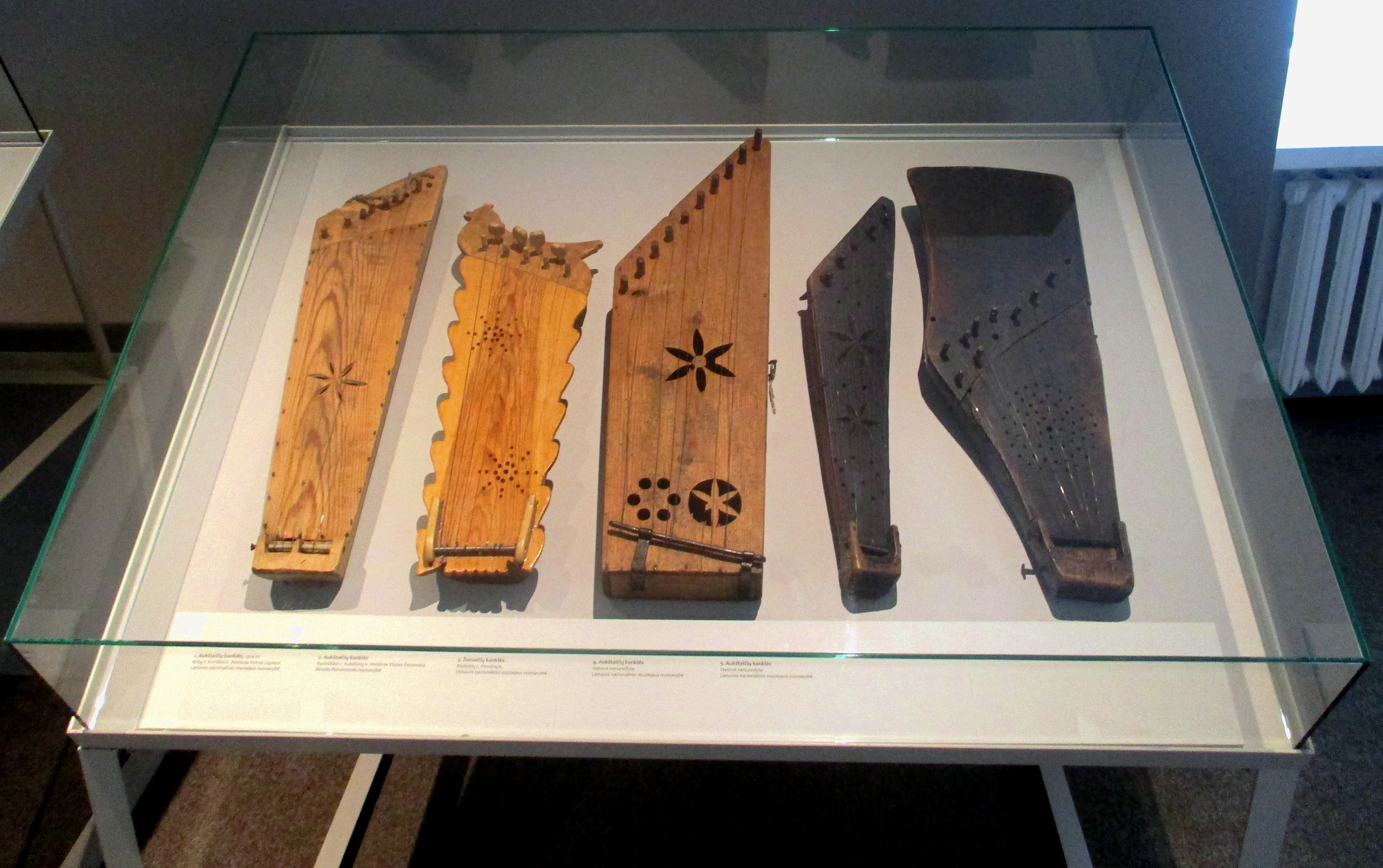
- Various Aukštaitian and Samogitian kanklės in the National Museum of Lithuania, made at the end of 19th century – beginning of 20th century

String instrument
- Other names: Kankliai, kunkliai, kunklaliai, kanklos, kanklys, kanklus, kunkl, kankalai
- Classification: Plucked string instrument, chordophone, zither
- Hornbostel–Sachs classification: 314.122 (Diatonic lute-type stringed instrument)
- Inventor: Folk instrument

Related instruments
- Kokles, kannel, kantele, gusli, zither, psaltery, dulcimer

The kanklės (Lithuanian: [ˈkɐŋʲkʲlʲeːs]; Samogitian: Konklē) is a Lithuanian plucked string instrument (chordophone) belonging to the Baltic box zither family known as the Baltic psaltery, along with the Latvian kokles, Estonian kannel, Finnish kantele, and Russian gusli.

== Etymology ==
According to Finnish linguist Eino Nieminen, the name of the instrument, along with the names of most of its neighbouring counterparts (Latvian kokles, Finnish kantele, Estonian kannel and Livonian kāndla), possibly comes from the proto-Baltic form *kantlīs/*kantlēs, which originally meant 'the singing tree', most likely deriving from the Proto-Indo-European root *qan- ('to sing, to sound'; cf. Latin "canto", Irish "can", English "chant, cantor").

A Lithuanian ethnologist, Romualdas Apanavičius, believes Kanklės could be derived from the Proto-European root *gan(dh)-, meaning 'a vessel; a haft (of a sword)', suggesting that it may be related to the Russian word gusli.

== Construction ==
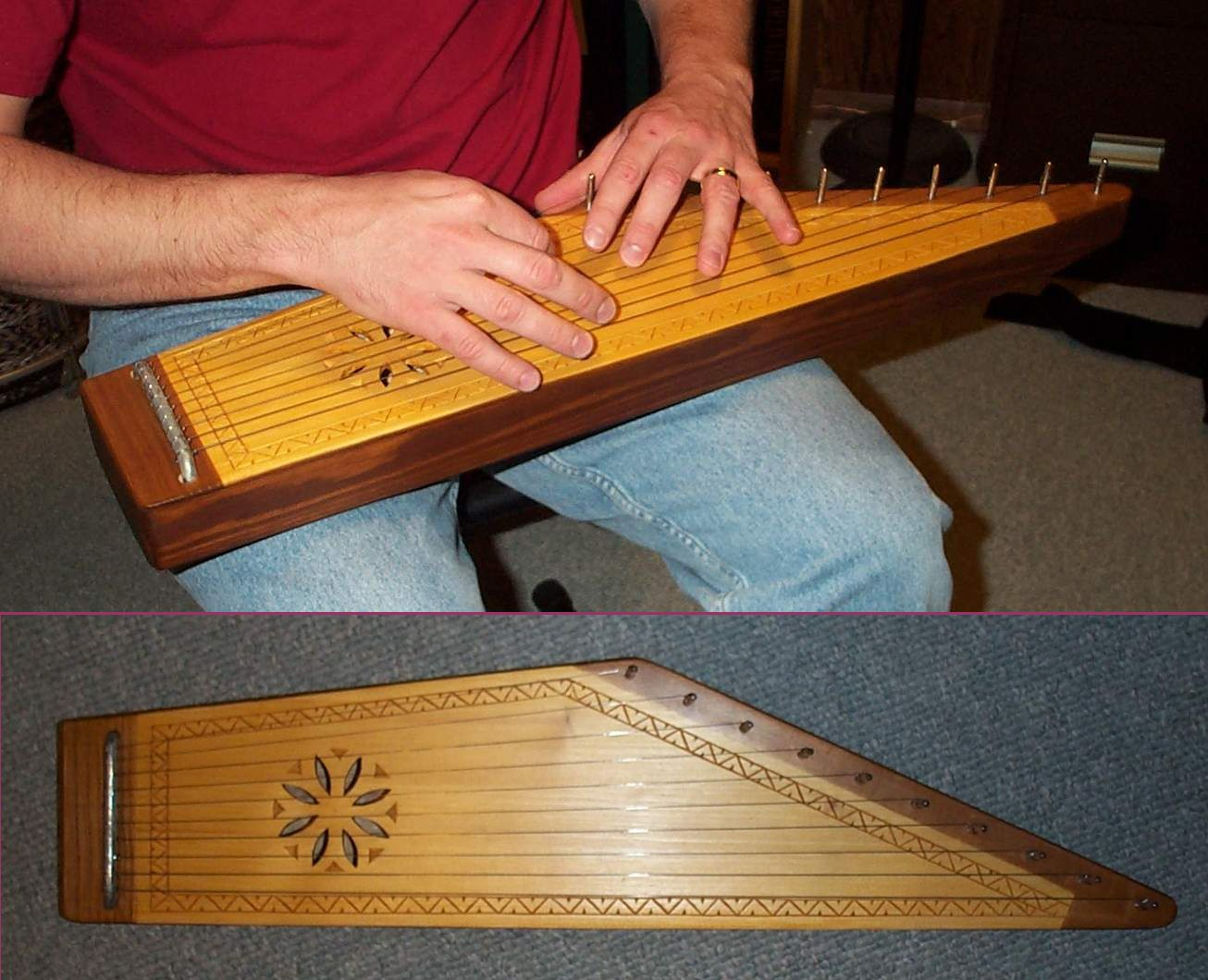
Samogitian kanklės made in 2002 by Egidijus Virbašius

Although kanklės vary both regionally and individually, there are some common characteristics in their construction.

Kanklės belong to the zither family, which means that their strings are parallel to the soundboard (not perpendicular, as with a harp) and do not extend beyond it (in contrast to e.g. a guitar, in which they extend to the neck). The body of the kanklės is made from one trapezoidal piece of linden tree, ash tree, oak, maple or black alder, which is hollowed out to create a cavity. A thin sheet of softwood (usually spruce) is used to make a soundboard, which covers the body. Soundholes, which traditionally take the shape of a stylized flower or star, are cut into the soundboard, allowing sound to project outward. At the narrowest side of the body, a metal bar is attached to which the strings made of wire or gut are anchored. The opposite ends of the strings are attached to a row of tuning pegs inserted into holes at the opposite side of the body.

The kanklės is usually rested on the player's lap, and played with the fingers or with a pick made of bone or quill.

== History ==
According to Birutė Žalalienė, psaltery, coming from Western Europe, could have been used in Lithuania to accompany church singing since the 15th century, and later in folk music in Lithuania Minor and Samogitia.

The word "kanklės" is first used in writing in 1580 by Jonas Bretkūnas in his Bible translation. Vincas Kudirka published two collections of folk songs adapted for choirs, titled Kanklės, in 1895 and 1898. In 1906, Pranas Puskunigis established an ensemble of kanklės players, mostly from the students at the Veiveriai Teachers' Seminary, in Skriaudžiai. This ensemble, known simply as "Kanklės" since 1984, continues to this day. A school for kanklės players was opened in 1930 in Kaunas. Kanklės are taught at the Lithuanian Academy of Music and Theatre since 1945. Concert kanklės were first constructed in 1964.

== Types ==
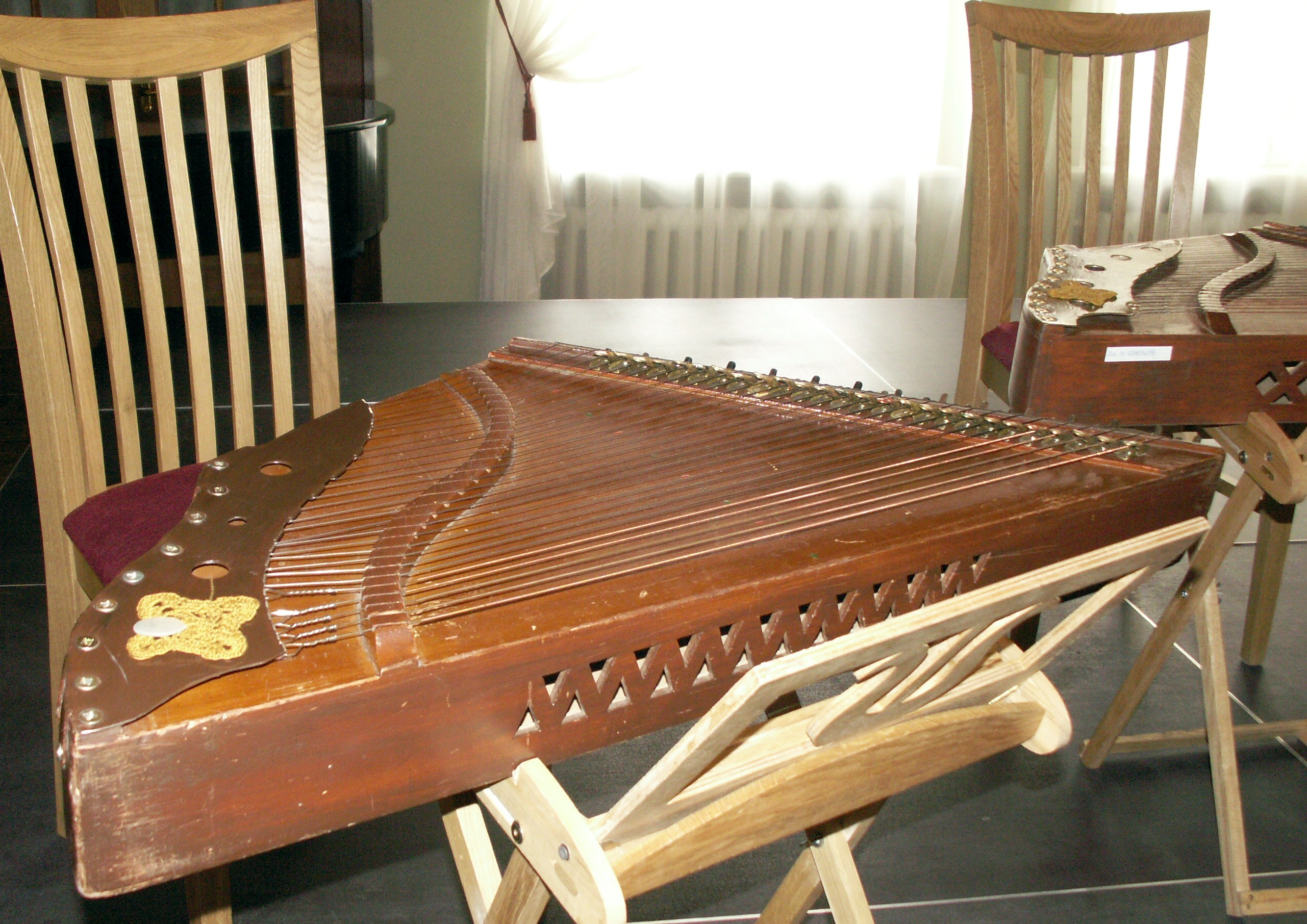
29-stringed concert kanklės with a music stand

Apanavičius classifies the kanklės into three basic traditional types, although there are variations within each type and some overlap of areas. Each type has its own playing technique.

- Kanklės of Northeastern Aukštaitians: the simplest and most ancient form. Carved out of a single piece of wood into a boat or coffin shape.
- Kanklės of Western Aukštaitians and Samogitians: somewhat larger than those of Northeastern Aukštaitija, usually having between eight and twelve strings. They have a flat bottom, and in some cases, the shortest end is carved with the stylized figure of a bird's or fish's tail.
- Kanklės of Northwestern Samogitians and Suvalkians: usually the most decorated type, and kanklės used in concert performance are most often based on this variety. The most prominent identifying feature is the addition of a carved spiral figure to the point of the instrument's body and sometimes, the rounding of the narrow end of the body. Typically these instruments have between nine and thirteen strings.

Concert kanklės, with an expanded range of more than four octaves (29 strings, C3-C7) and added chromaticism, provided by means of metal levers at the side of the instrument, similar to the ones used in a Celtic or lever harp, were constructed in 1964 by P. Kupčikas following the design of P. Stepulis and D. Mataitienė. In the 1960s they followed the lead of Latvian concert kokles which had first been constructed in 1951.

== Bibliography ==
- Tarnauskaitė-Palubinskienė, Vida (2009). Kanklės lietuvių etninėje kultūroje [Kanklės in the Ethnic Culture of Lithuanians]. Vilnius: Lithuanian University of Educational Sciences. ISBN 978-9955-20-449-7.
