= Kokle =

Latvian folk music instrument

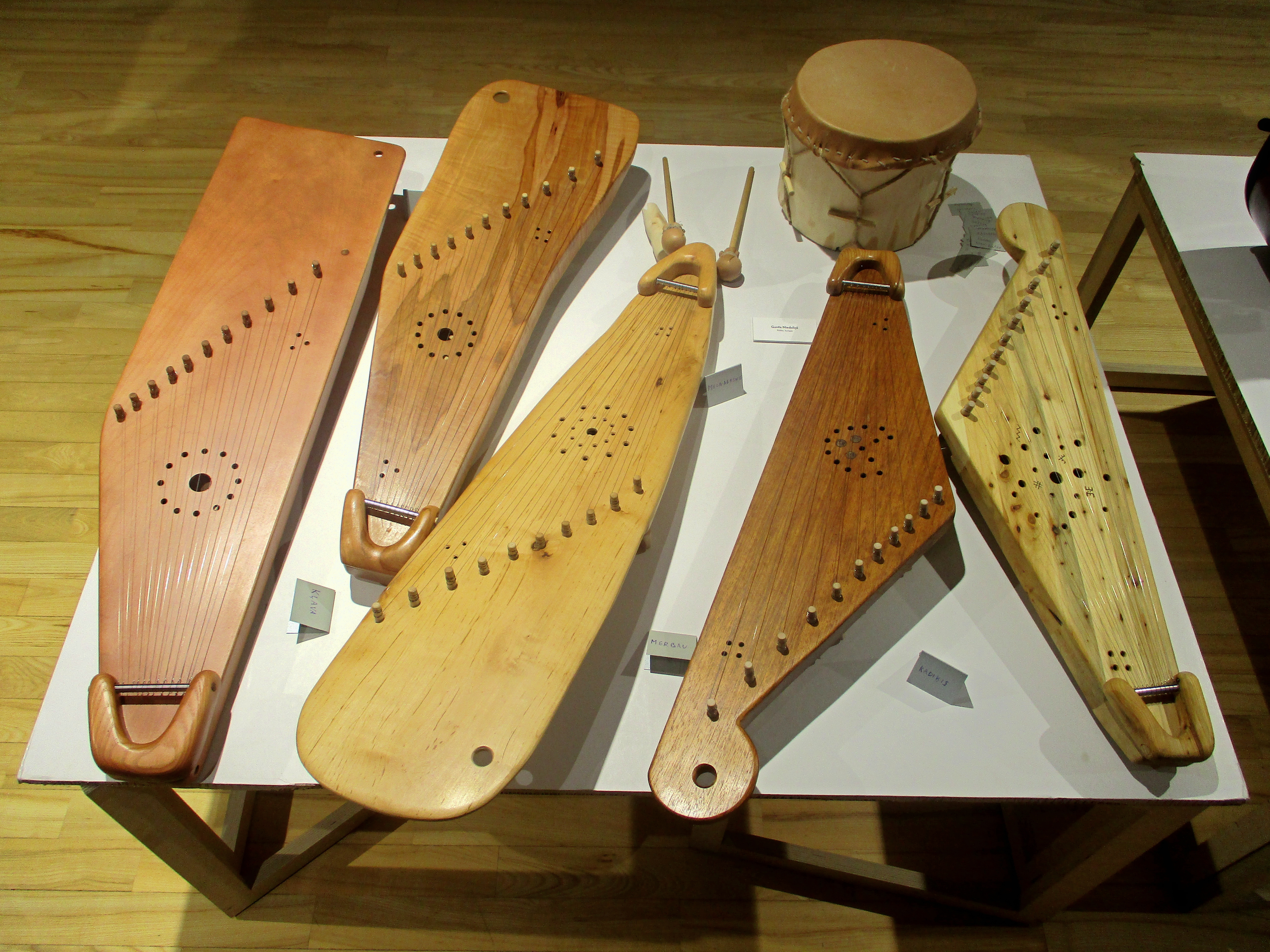
- Different types of kokles made by Guntis Niedoliņš

String instrument
- Other names: Kokle; Kūkles, kūkļas, kūkļes, kūklis, kūkļis, kūkle, kūkļe, kūkla and kūkļa (Latgale)
- Classification: Chordophone
- Hornbostel–Sachs classification: 314.122-5 (Diatonic lute-type stringed instrument played using bare hands and fingers)
- Inventor(s): Folk instrument

Related instruments
- Kanklės, kannel, kantele, gusli

Musicians
- Mārtiņš Baumanis, Nikolajs Heņķis (1864–1934), Namejs Kalniņš, Pēteris Korāts (1871–1957), Māris Muktupāvels, Valdis Muktupāvels, Biruta Ozoliņa, Latvīte Podiņa, Laima Jansone, Jānis Poriķis (1909–1992), Aloizijs Jūsmiņš (1915–1979; concert kokles)

Builders
- Nikolajs Heņķis (1864–1934), Pēteris Korāts (1871–1957), Gunārs Igaunis, Māris Jansons, Eduards Klints, Ģirts Laube, Krists Lazdiņš, Kārlis Lipors, Imants Robežnieks (concert kokles), Jānis Poriķis (1909–1992), Andris Roze, Jānis Rozenbergs, Rihards Valters, Edgars Vilmanis-Meženieks, Donāts Vucins (1934–1999)

Kokle (Latvian pronunciation: ['kʊ͡ɔk.le]; Latgalian: kūkle) or historically kokles (kūkles) is a Latvian plucked string instrument (chordophone) belonging to the Baltic box zither family known as the Baltic psaltery along with Lithuanian kanklės, Estonian kannel, Finnish kantele, and Russian krylovidnye gusli. The first possible kokles related archaeological findings in the territory of modern Latvia are from the 13th century, while the first reliable written information about kokles playing comes from the beginning of the 17th century. The first known kokles tune was notated in 1891, but the first kokles recordings into gramophone records and movies were made in the 1930s. Both kokles and kokles playing are included in the Latvian Culture Canon.

== Etymology ==
According to Finnish linguist Eino Nieminen, the name of the instrument, along with the names of most of its neighbouring counterparts (Lithuanian kanklės, Finnish kantele, Estonian kannel and Livonian kāndla), possibly comes from the proto-Baltic form *kantlīs/*kantlēs, which originally meant 'the singing tree', ultimately deriving from the Proto-European root *qan- ('to sing, to sound'). However, Lithuanian ethnologist Romualdas Apanavičius believes kokles could be derived from the Proto-European root *gan(dh)-, meaning 'a vessel; a haft (of a sword)', suggesting that it may be related to the Russian word gusli.

== Construction ==
The kokles has a hollow trapezoidal body (ķermenis or korpuss) usually carved out of a single piece of wood (vienkocis) that's topped with a thin ornated wooden soundboard (skaņgaldiņš). A distinct feature that sets kokles apart from most of the other string instruments is that the strings don't rest on a bridge, making the sound quieter, but richer in timbre. Wooden (or sometimes metal) tuning pegs (tapas) are set into the wide tip of the body, while at the narrow tip is a metal rod (stīgturis) upon which the strings are secured, giving them a slightly fan-shaped arrangement. The strings may be of brass or steel. Traditionally, there were 6–9 strings which later increased to 10 and more.

== Playing ==
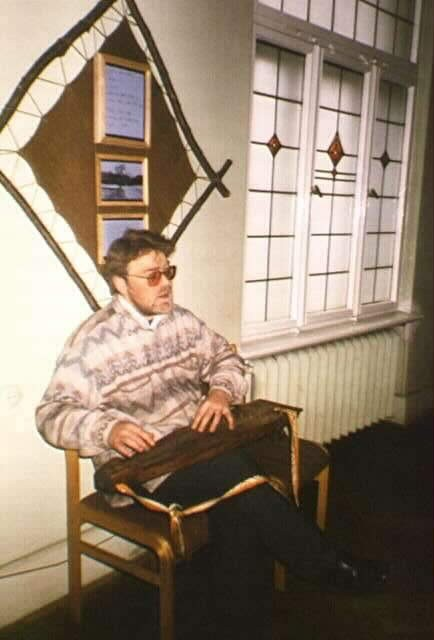
Latgale kokles player in Riga

The technique of kokles playing differs from most other plucked string instruments, including that of zither, harp and guitar. There are also some playing differences between the regional types of Latgale and Kurzeme instruments. In Kurzeme kokles was generally played while sitting on a stool, bench or chair without armrests and placing it horizontally in the lap with legs slightly parted. It could be played while laid on a table as well. For Latgale kokles the size and form of the instrument also allowed for it to be steadily placed in the lap in a vertical position, resting the shorter edge of kokles against the stomach and placing both arms on the instrument for extra comfort and stability.

Strumming is done with the index finger of the right hand while the left hand is used for muting unwanted strings by lightly placing fingers on them. An alternative string muting technique found in Latgale features the fingers being inserted in-between the strings, but such option heavily restricts the movement of the left arm. The left hand can also be used for picking strings.

== Tuning ==
Tuning of the kokles is a diatonic scale, with some lower strings traditionally functioning as drones. A few traditional tuning variations include D-G-A-H-C for 5-stringed kokles written down by Andrejs Jurjāns at the end of the 19th century, D-C-D-E-F-G-A for 7-stringed kokles and D-C-D-E-F-G-A-H-C for 9-stringed kokles both used by traditional suiti kokles player Jānis Poriķis. However, as kokles began to be constructed with more strings and Latgale kokles became the dominant type of kokles among many other factors, the drone strings have gradually lost their function and become just a lower range extension of the kokles' diapason. Since the 1980s, the most popular tunings among kokles players for 11-stringed kokles are G-A-C-D-E-F-G-A-B-C (GA) and G-A-C-D-E-F-G-A-B♭-C (GA-b♭).

== Types ==
In his book "The Baltic Psaltery and Playing Traditions in Latvia" (Kokles un koklēšana Latvijā) Latvian ethnomusicologist Valdis Muktupāvels distinguishes 3 types of traditional kokles – Kurzeme kokles (Kurzemes kokles), Latgale kokles (Latgales kokles) and zither kokles (cītarkokles) – and 3 types of modernised kokles – the so-called 15-stringed Krasnopjorovs'-Ķirpis' diatonic kokles (Krasnopjorova-Ķirpja diatoniskās kokles) and the concert kokles (koncertkokles) both designed in the Latvian SSR in 1940s to 1960s, as well as the so-called 13-stringed Linauts'-Dravnieks'-Jansons' kokles (Linauta-Dravnieka-Jansona kokles) that emerged in the Latvian American community in the 1960s.

=== Kurzeme kokles ===
Side view of the so-called "Piltene kokle" (Piltenes kokle). Below transcription of the engraved symbols and its possible Latvian translation according to the ethnographer Matīss Siliņš

In the Latvian historical region of Kurzeme kokles are traditionally constructed smaller in size and without a "wing", but with more ornate carvings and ornaments. It also usually has fewer strings than Latgale kokles, ranging from 5 to 6 stings for the ones found at the west coast of Kurzeme and Selonia to 7, 8 or even 9 strings for the suiti inhabited areas.

On May 17, 2015, during Latvia's presidency of the Council of the European Union, a Kurzeme kokles built by the crafter Jānis Rozenbergs was donated to the Musical Instruments Museum of Brussels.

=== Latgale kokles ===
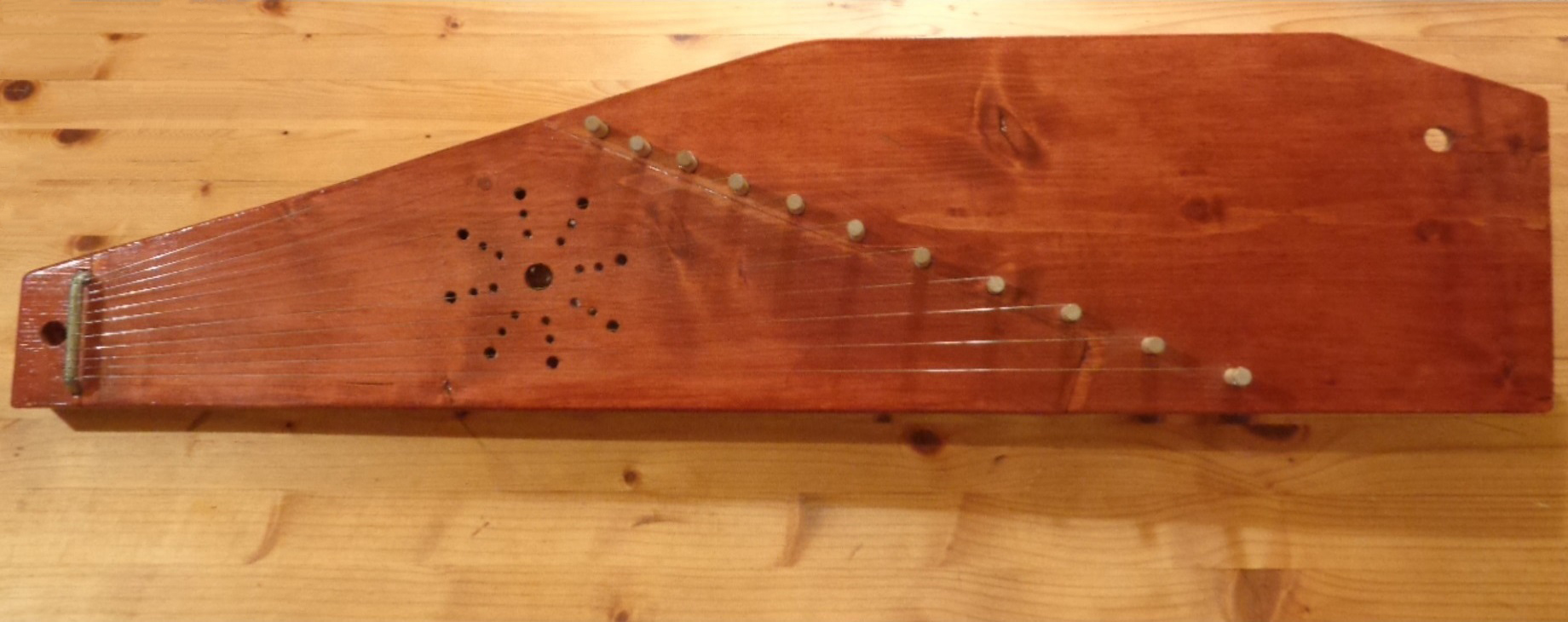
11-string Latgale kokles with aspen body, fir soundboard and oak tuning pegs

In the largely Catholic Latgale region of Latvia, it was characteristic for the kokles to be constructed with an extension of the body beyond the peg line called a wing, that reinforces the sound of the instrument and can also be used as an arm support. Estonian ethnologist Igor Tõnurist believes that the wing may be a more recent innovation, that developed sometime before the 14th century for the Baltic psaltery played in the Pskov and Novgorod lands and later was borrowed by some neighbouring Baltic and Baltic Finnic people, such as Setos, Vepsians, and Latgalians. In comparison with Kurzeme kokles, the finish of Latgale kokles is less thorough; the instrument is bigger and heavier, with more strings (sometimes even up to 12 and only in rare cases less than 9) and with a more sober decoration.

In the Augšzeme-Vidzeme region both types of kokles, as well as mixed forms (for example, kokles with a small wing) were constructed.

=== Zither kokles ===
At the end of the 19th century and the beginning of the 20th century kokles traditions were influenced by the construction and playing style of the Western zithers coming from Germany and other Central European countries. Thus arose the so-called zither kokles: kokles with larger, zither-type cases, steel tuning pins, and an increased number of strings (from 17 to sometimes even up to 30 single or double strings).

=== Concert kokles ===
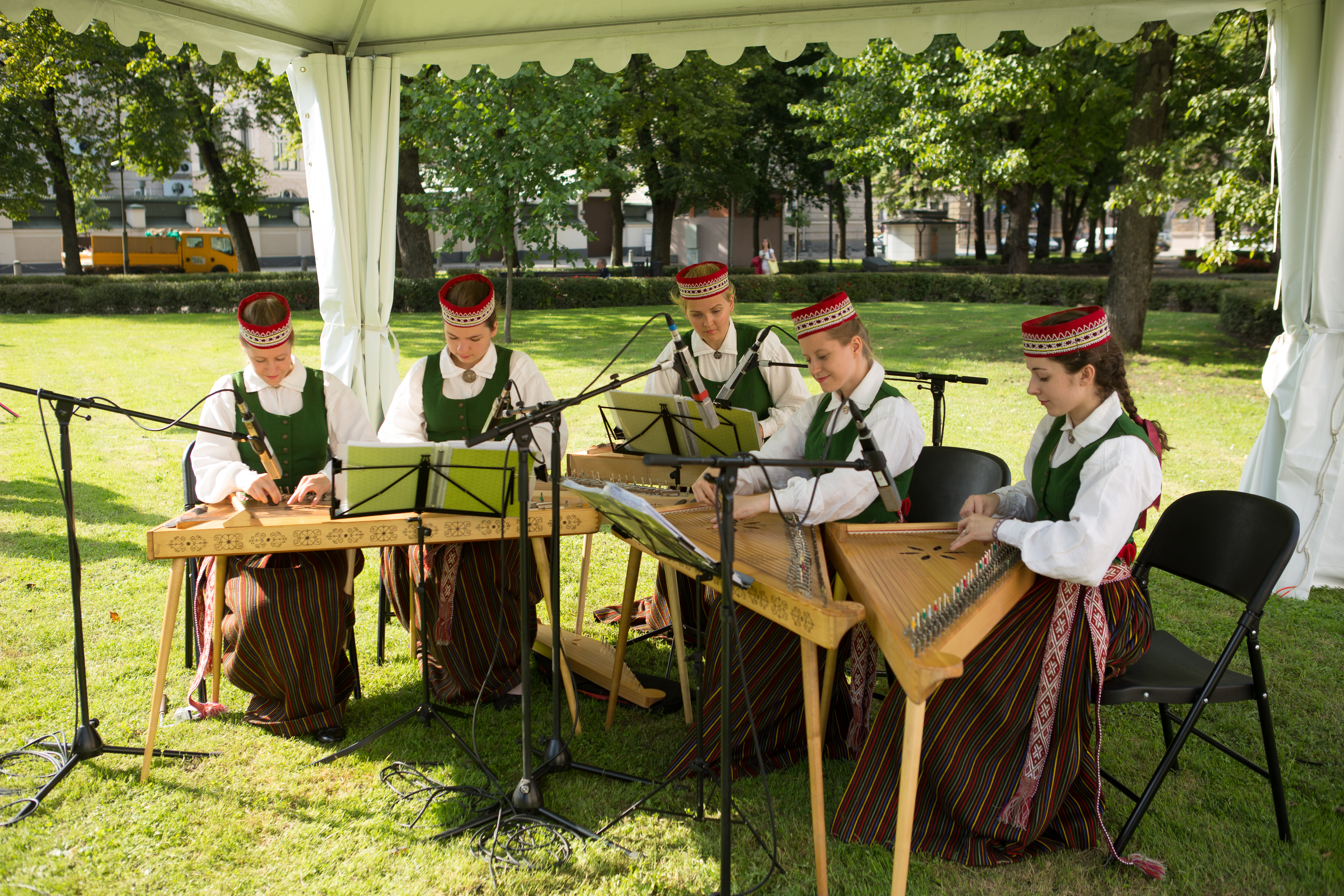
Latvian concert kokles ensemble

The first larger "concert kokle" with a three-and-a-half octave range and 25 stings was constructed in 1951 by Romāns Ķirpis for the Latvian folk music orchestra's soloist Helēna Kļava-Birgmeistere. It was the first to have devices for changing the pitches of strings in order to change keys. Few years later concert kokles saw a few more innovations in the construction and the new design gradually spread in the Latvian Conservatoire and musical schools, as well as amateur kokles ensembles.

For a long time, concert kokles were produced at the Musical Instrument Factory of Riga, mainly from leftover materials used for pianos. After Latvia regained its independence, the factory was closed and there were no dedicated kokles craftsmen until the mid-1990s. Soon, Imants Robežnieks, who had previously worked at the factory, started making and fixing kokles again after receiving numerous requests from kokles players. Since then, he has been the only professional luthier of concert kokles in Latvia.

== In mythology ==
Valdis Muktupāvels regards kokles as the most highly socially and economically valued Latvian instrument. Mythologically kokles may have been linked with the solar and celestial sphere as they are also sometimes called "Kokles of Dievs" (Dieva kokles) or "golden kokles" (zelta kokles) and sun ornaments were traditionally carved in the soundboard. Kokles, kokles playing (koklēšana) and kokles players (koklētāji) are mentioned in 274 Latvian dainas and mythological kokles players include Jānis and other unnamed sons of Dievs, as well as Saule playing kokles while sitting in the Austras koks.

== In modern music ==
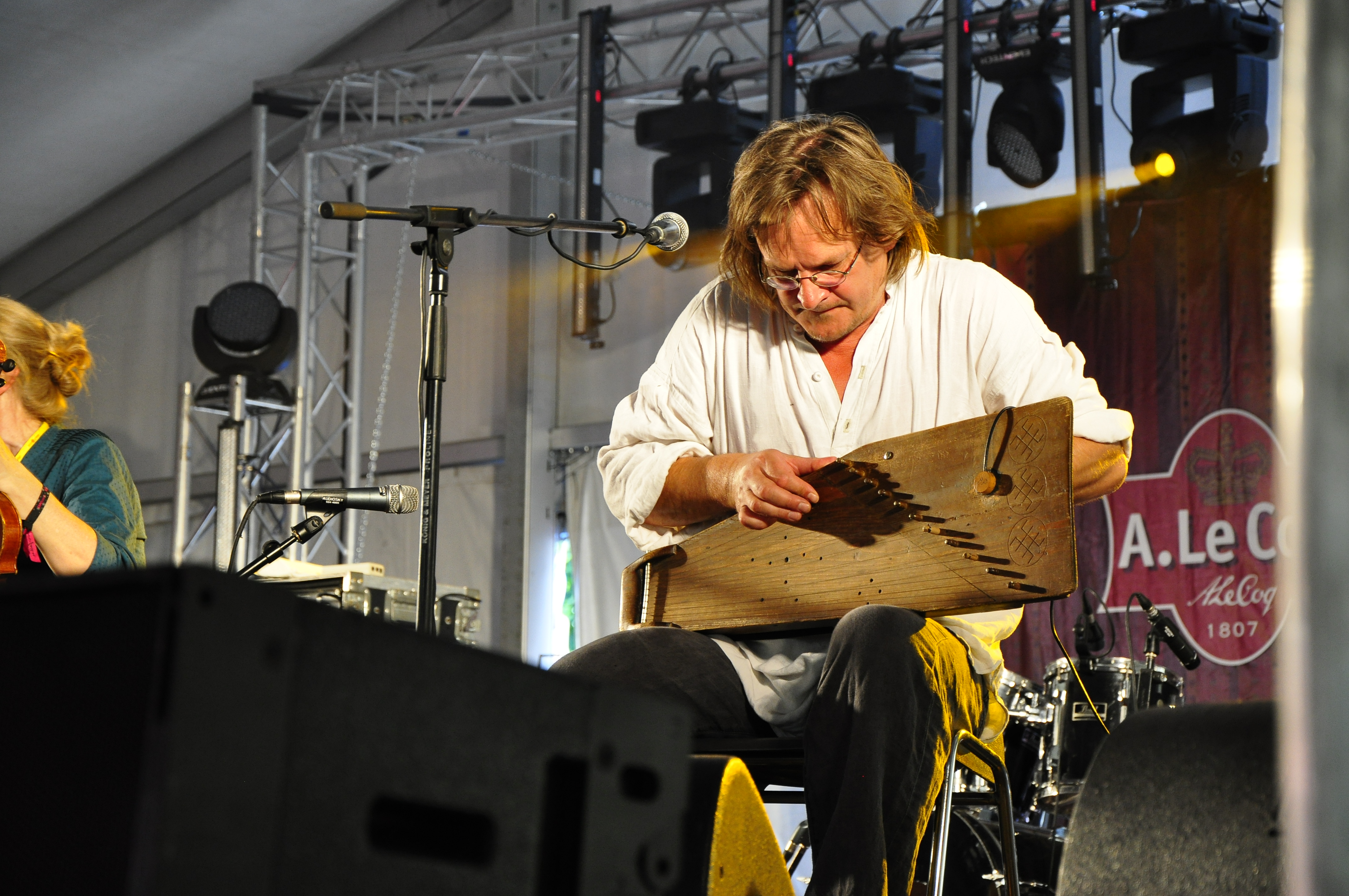
Māris Muktupāvels tuning kokles during a concert with the post-folk band Iļģi, July 24, 2010

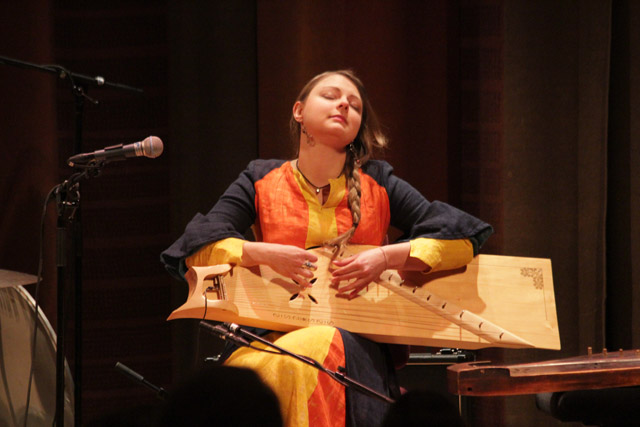
Kokles player Laima Jansone at a concert in Sweden, February 5, 2015

Already at the first kokles revival in the 1930s and 1940s kokles music saw an influx of newly composed folk music-inspired compositions and orchestral arrangements of folk songs. However, only recently has kokles truly grown to transcend the boundaries of traditional folk music. From the experimental post-folk band Iļģi, Biruta Ozoliņa's and DJ Monsta's electronic folk collaboration, Laima Jansone's free improvisations and fusion of kokles' sounds with jazz in the project "Zarbugans" to a more heavier kokles-accompanied folk metal sound of Skyforger.

In 2002 record label Upe released a double CD by ethnomusicologist Valdis Muktupāvels titled "Kokles", dedicated to the instrument. The first disc "Muktukokles" contains 9 Muktupāvels' original kokles compositions and 2 arrangements of traditional songs accompanied by other instruments (sarod, tambura, and tabla), as well as the vocals of Rūta Muktupāvela, while the second disc "Tradicionālās kokles" contains 24 Kurzeme, suiti and Latgale traditional tunes and dance melodies.

In 2016 record label Lauska released a CD Trejdeviņi koklētāji (Thrice-nine kokles players) featuring some of the best known Latvian kokles players (Valdis Muktupāvels, Laima Jansone, Biruta Ozoliņa and Ansis Jansons among others) and Baltic psaltery players from abroad (Leanne Barbo from Estonia and Jenni Venäläinen from Finland), as well as Latvian concert kokles ensembles, with a collection of 13 compositions that span from traditional to ethno-jazz and ethno-baroque genres. A bilingual Latvian-English hardback booklet was also included with notes on performing musicians and their compositions, as well as a brief history of kokles.

== Bibliography ==
- Muktupāvels, Valdis (2013). The Baltic Psaltery and Playing Traditions in Latvia. Translated by Jātniece, Amanda (2nd ed.). Riga: Lauska. ISBN 978-9934-8276-2-4.
- Muktupāvels, Valdis (2018). Slišāne, Laura (ed.). Folk music instruments in Latvia. Translated by Damberga, Andra. The University of Latvia Press. ISBN 978-9934-1824-8-8.
