= Plucked string instrument =

Subcategory of string instruments

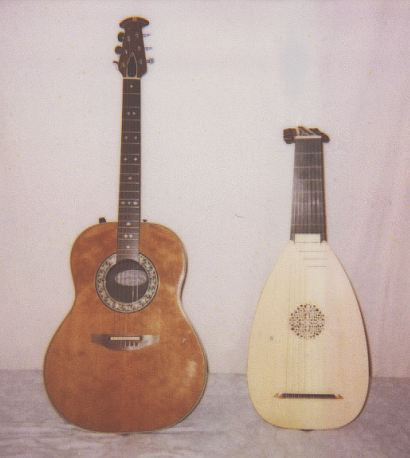
Guitar and lute

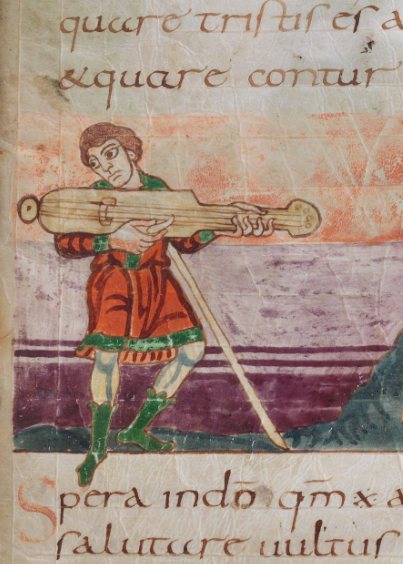
This illustration in a French Psalter from the 9th century (c. 830) shows a little known plucked string instrument called cythara in manuscripts.

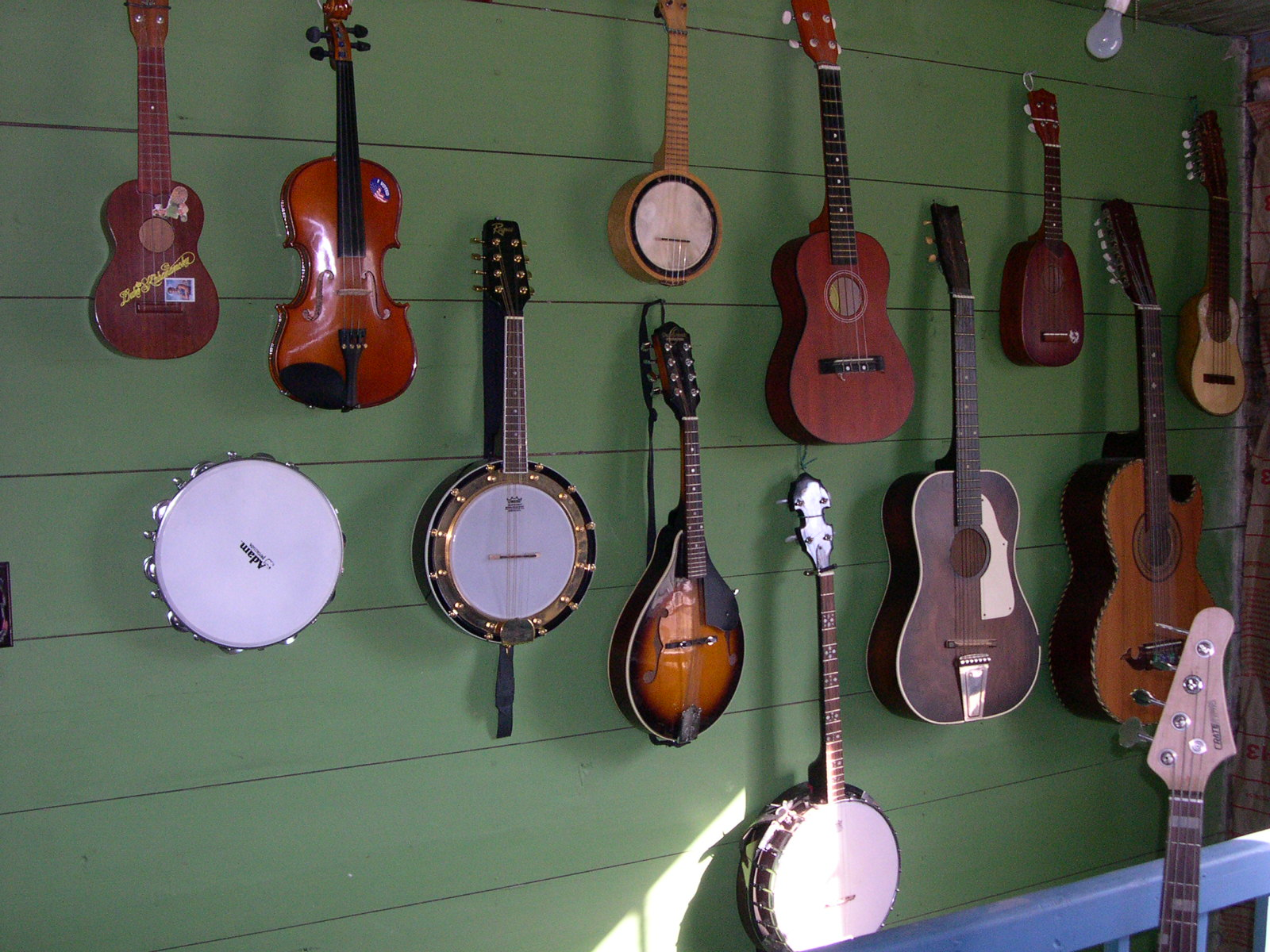
Stringed instruments hanging on a wall. Shown here are 4 Ukuleles, 2 Mandolins, a Banjo, a Guitar, a Violin, a Guraitar and a Bass guitar.

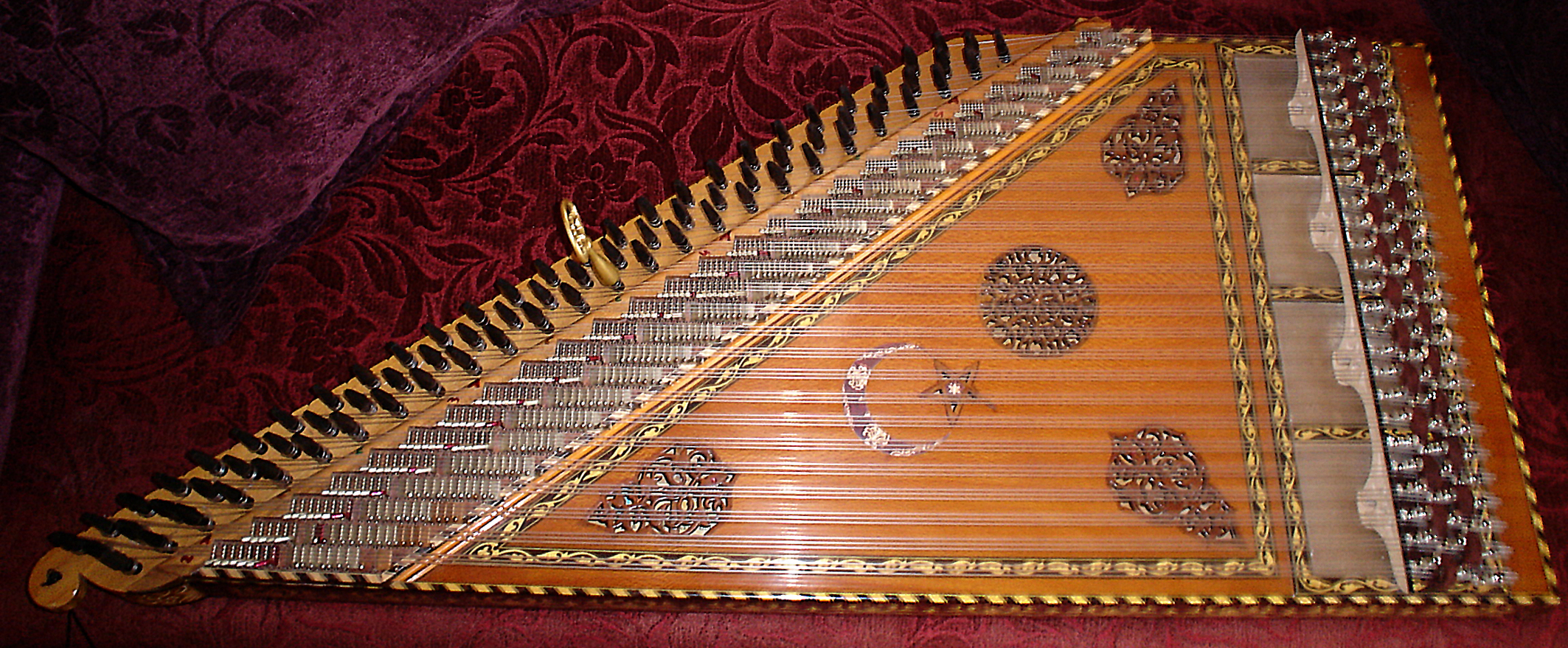
Qanún/kanun, origin from ancient Mesopotamia

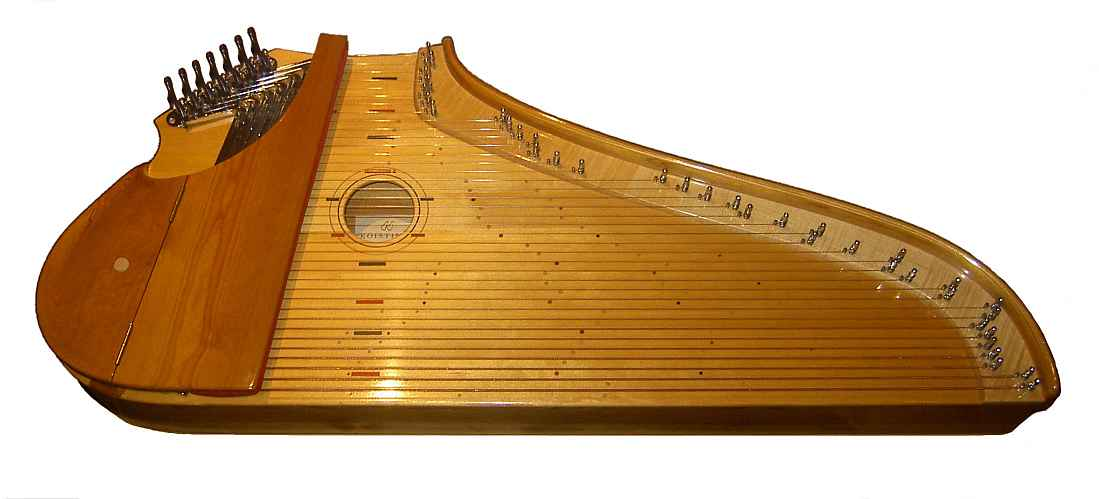
Kantele

Plucked string instruments are a subcategory of string instruments that are played by plucking the strings. Plucking is a way of pulling and releasing the string in such a way as to give it an impulse that causes the string to vibrate. Plucking can be done with either a finger or a plectrum.

Most plucked string instruments belong to the lute family (such as guitar, bass guitar, mandolin, banjo, balalaika, sitar, pipa, etc.), which generally consist of a resonating body, and a neck; the strings run along the neck and can be stopped at different pitches.

The zither family (including the Qanún/kanun, autoharp, kantele, gusli, kannel, kankles, kokles, koto, guqin, gu zheng and many others) does not have a neck, and the strings are stretched across the soundboard.

In the harp family (including the lyre), the strings are perpendicular to the soundboard and do not run across it. The harpsichord does not fit any of these categories but is also a plucked string instrument, as its strings are struck with a plectrum when the keys are depressed.

Bowed string instruments, such as the violin, can also be plucked in the technique known as pizzicato; however, as they are usually played with a bow, they are not included in this category. Struck string instruments (such as the piano) can be similarly plucked as an extended technique.

Plucked string instruments are not a category in the Sachs-Hornbostel classification, aside from 335 and 336, as some of them are simple chordophones and others are composite. It's depending on whether the resonator is the removable part of the instrument.

== List of plucked string instruments ==
- 3rd bridge guitar
- Acoustic bass guitar
- Akonting (Senegal)
- Appalachian dulcimer (United States)
- Autoharp
- Bağlama (Turkey)
- Baglamas (Greece)
- Bajo sexto (Mexico)
- Balalaika (Russia, Ukraine, Belarus)
- Bandura (Ukraine)
- Bandurria (Spain)
- Bandolin (Ecuador)
- Banjo (American)
- Banjolele (United Kingdom)
- Barbat (Iran)
- Begena (Ethiopia)
- Biwa (Japan)
- Bordonua (Puerto Rico)
- Bouzouki (Greece)
- Bugarija (Croatia)
- Cak (Indonesia)
- Cavaquinho (Portugal and Brazil)
- Çeng (Turkey)
- Charango (South America)
- Chitarra battente (Italy)
- Çiftelia (Albania and Kosovo)
- Citole
- Cittern
- Cobza (Romania and Hungary)
- Colascione (southern Italy)
- Contrabass
- Cuatro (Latin American)
- Cuk (Indonesia)
- Cümbüş (Turkey)
- Đàn bầu (Vietnam)
- Đàn nguyệt (Vietnam)
- Đàn tam (Vietnam)
- Đàn tranh (Vietnam)
- Đàn tỳ bà (Vietnam)
- Daruan (China)
- Diddley bow (United States)
- Dombra (East Europe and Central Asia)
- Domra (Russia, Ukraine, Belarus)
- Doshpuluur (Tuva)
- Dotara (India)
- Dutar (Iran, Central Asia)
- Duxianqin (China)
- Ektara (India)
- Electric bass
  - Electric upright bass
- Gayageum (Korea)
- Geomungo (Korea)
- Gittern (Western Europe)
- Gottuvadhyam (India)
- Guitar
  - Classical guitar
  - Solid-body classical guitar
  - Acoustic guitar
  - Steel-string acoustic guitar
  - Chapman Stick
  - Cigar box guitar
  - Slide guitar
  - Electric guitar
  - Harp guitar
  - Resonator guitar (a.k.a. dobro)
  - Lyre-guitar
- Guitarrón chileno (Chile)
- Guitarrón mexicano (Mexico)
- Gusli (Russia)
- Guqin (China)
- Guzheng (China)
- Harp
  - Electric harp
  - Cross-strung harp
- Harpsichord (Europe, keyboard instrument)
- Irish bouzouki
- Jakhe (Thailand)
- Jarana huasteca (Mexico)
- Jarana jarocha (Mexico)
- Jouhikko (Finland, Karelia)
- Jumbush (Turkey)
- Kacapi (Indonesia)
- Kanklės (Lithuania)
- Kannel (instrument) (Estonia)
- Kantele (Finland)
- Kithara (Ancient Greece)
- Kobyz (Kazakhstan)
- Kobza (Ukraine)
- Kokles (Latvia)
- Konghou (China)
- Kontigi (Nigeria)
- Komuz (Central Asia)
- Kora (West Africa)
- Koto (Japan)
- Krar (Ethiopia)
- Kutiyapi (Philippines)
- Langeleik (Norway)
- Laúd (Spain)
- Liuqin (China)
- Lute (Europe)
  - Archlute
  - Theorbo
- Lyre (Ancient Greece, Sumer)
- Mandolin family
  - Mandolin
  - Mandore (instrument)
  - Mandola
  - Octave mandola
  - Mandocello
  - Mandobass
  - Mandolone
  - Laouto (Greece, Cyprus, Romania, Albania)
- Mandolin-banjo (a crossover instrument, not part of the mandola family)
- Mejoranera (Panama)
- Mohan veena
- Monochord
- Musical bow
- Nyatiti (Kenya)
- Octavina (Philippines)
- Oud (Middle East, Greece)
- Pandura
- Panduri (Georgia)
- Phandar (Chechnya and Ingushetia)
- Pipa (China)
- Portuguese guitar
- Psaltery
- Pyngyr (Ukraine)
- Qanún/kanun (Middle East, Persia, Greece)
- Qanbūs (Arabian Peninsula)
- Qinqin (China)
- Rawap
- Requinto
- Rote
- Rubab (Iran)
- Rudra veena (India)
- Sagar veena (Pakistan)
- Sallaneh (Iran)
- Sanshin (Japan)
- Sanxian (China)
- Saraswati veena (India)
- Šargija (Eastern Europe)
- Sarod (India)
- Sasando (Indonesia)
- Saung (Burma)
- Swaraj (India)
- Saz (Turkey)
- Setar (Iran)
- Shamisen (Japan)
- Sitar (India)
- Tambura
- Tamburitza (Pannonian plain)
- Tanbur (Iran)
- Tar (Iran)
- Tati (Nagaland, India)
- Tea chest bass
- Tiple
  - Colombian tiple
- Torban (Ukraine)
- Tremoloa
- Tres (Cuba)
- Ukulele (Hawaii)
- Valiha (Madagascar)
- Veena (India)
- Vichitra veena (India)
- Vihuela (Spain)
- Viola toeira (Portugal)
- Xalam (west africa)
- Yueqin (China)
- Zhongruan (China)
- Zhu (China)
- Zither

== See also ==
- Stringed instrument tunings
