= Kantele =

Finnish and Karelian plucked string instrument

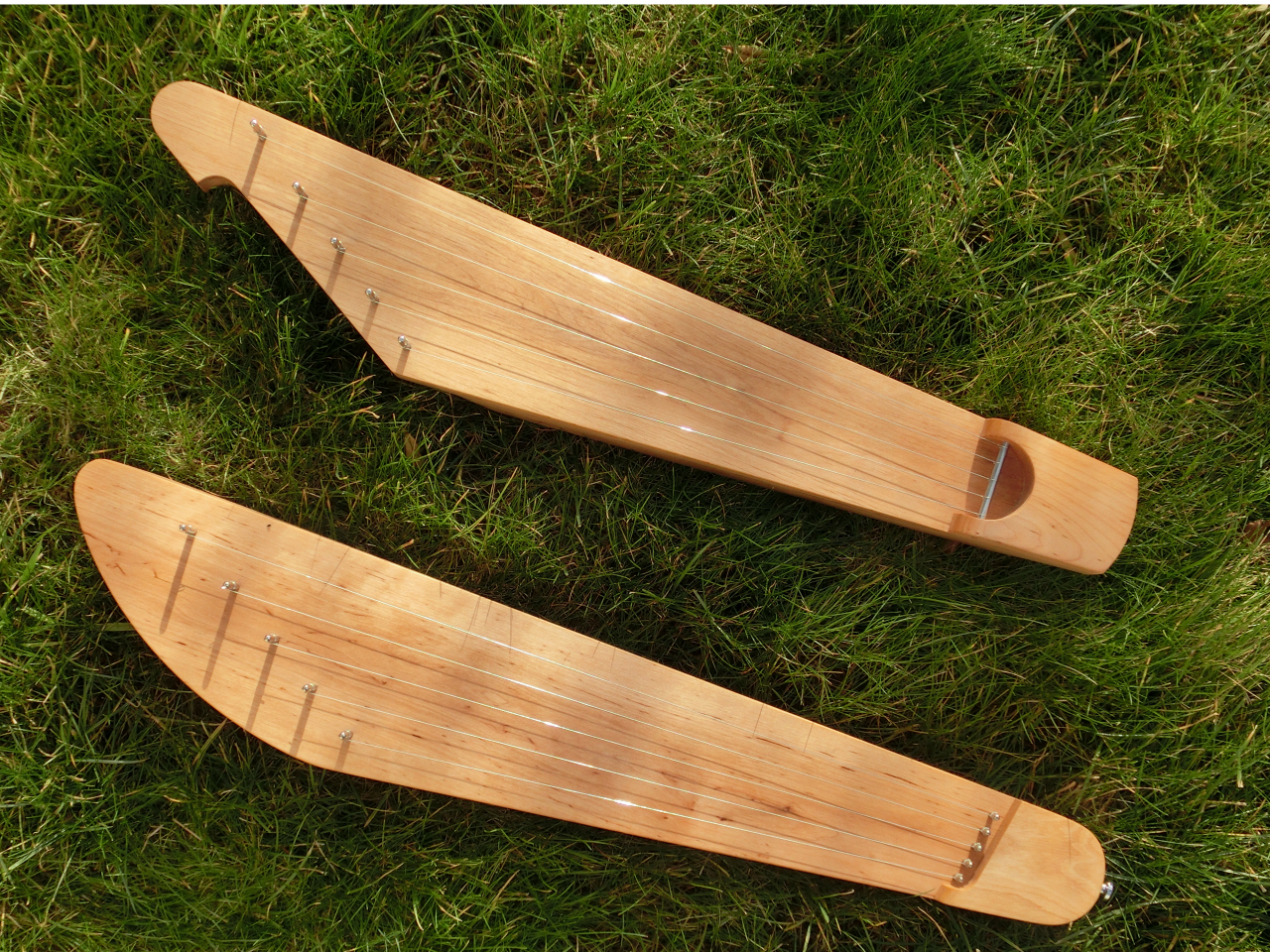
Two five-string kanteles by Melodia Soitin (2014). The shape of the upper kantele is more traditional, while the shape for the kantele below is slightly modernised

5-string kantele
Sounds samples from a home-made 5-string kantele

A kantele (Finnish: [ˈkɑntele]) or kannel (Finnish: [ˈkɑnːel]) is a traditional Finnish and Karelian plucked string instrument (chordophone). It belongs to the southeast Baltic box zither family known as the Baltic psaltery, along with the Estonian kannel, the Latvian kokles, the Lithuanian kanklės, and the Russian gusli.

== Construction ==
=== Small kantele ===
Modern instruments with 15 or fewer strings are generally more closely modeled on traditional shapes, and form a category of instrument known as small kantele, in contrast to the concert kantele.

The oldest forms of kantele have five or six horsehair strings and a wooden body carved from one piece; more modern instruments have metal strings and a body made from several pieces. The traditional kantele has neither bridge nor nut, the strings run directly from the tuning pegs to a metal bar (varras) set into wooden brackets (ponsi). Though not acoustically efficient, this construction is part of the distinctive sound of the instrument.

The most typical and traditional tuning of the five-string small kantele is just intonation arrived at via five-limit tuning, often in Dmajor or Dminor. This occurs if a kantele is played as a solo instrument or as a part of a folk music ensemble. The major triad is then formed by D^{1}–F♯^{1}–A^{1}. In modern variants of small kantele, there are often semitone levers for some strings. The most typical lever for a five-string kantele is a switch between F♯^{1} and F^{1}, which allows most folk music to be played without retuning. Larger versions of the small kantele often have additional semitone levers, allowing a more varied selection of music to be played without retuning.

=== Concert kantele ===
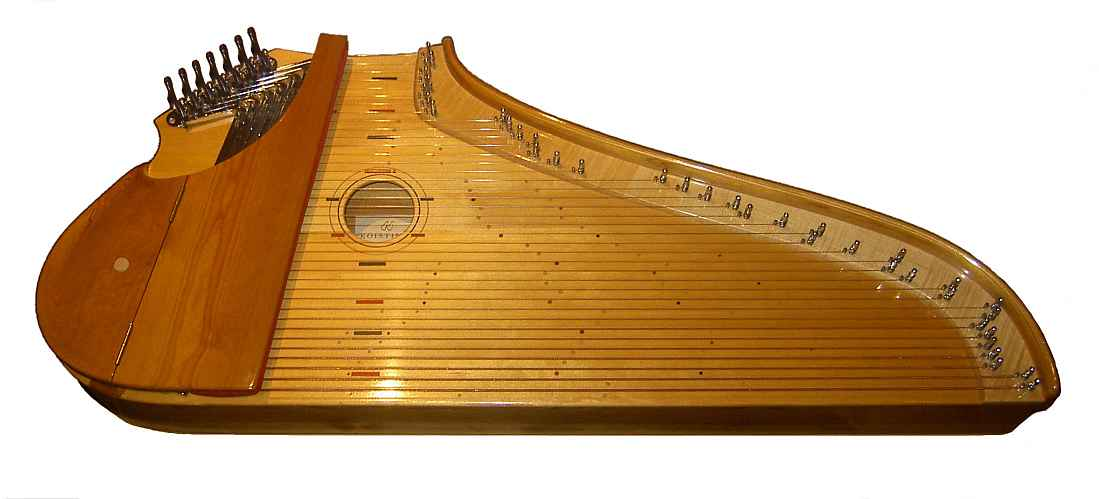
Koistinen 38-stringed concert kantele

A modern concert kantele can have up to 40 strings. The playing positions of the concert kantele and the small kantele are reversed: for a small kantele, the longest, low-pitched strings are furthest away from the musician's body, while for a concert kantele, this side of the instrument is nearest, and the short, high-pitched strings are the furthest away. Concert versions have a switch mechanism (similar to semitone levers on a modern folk harp) for making sharps and flats, an innovation introduced by Paul Salminen in the 1920s.

== Playing ==
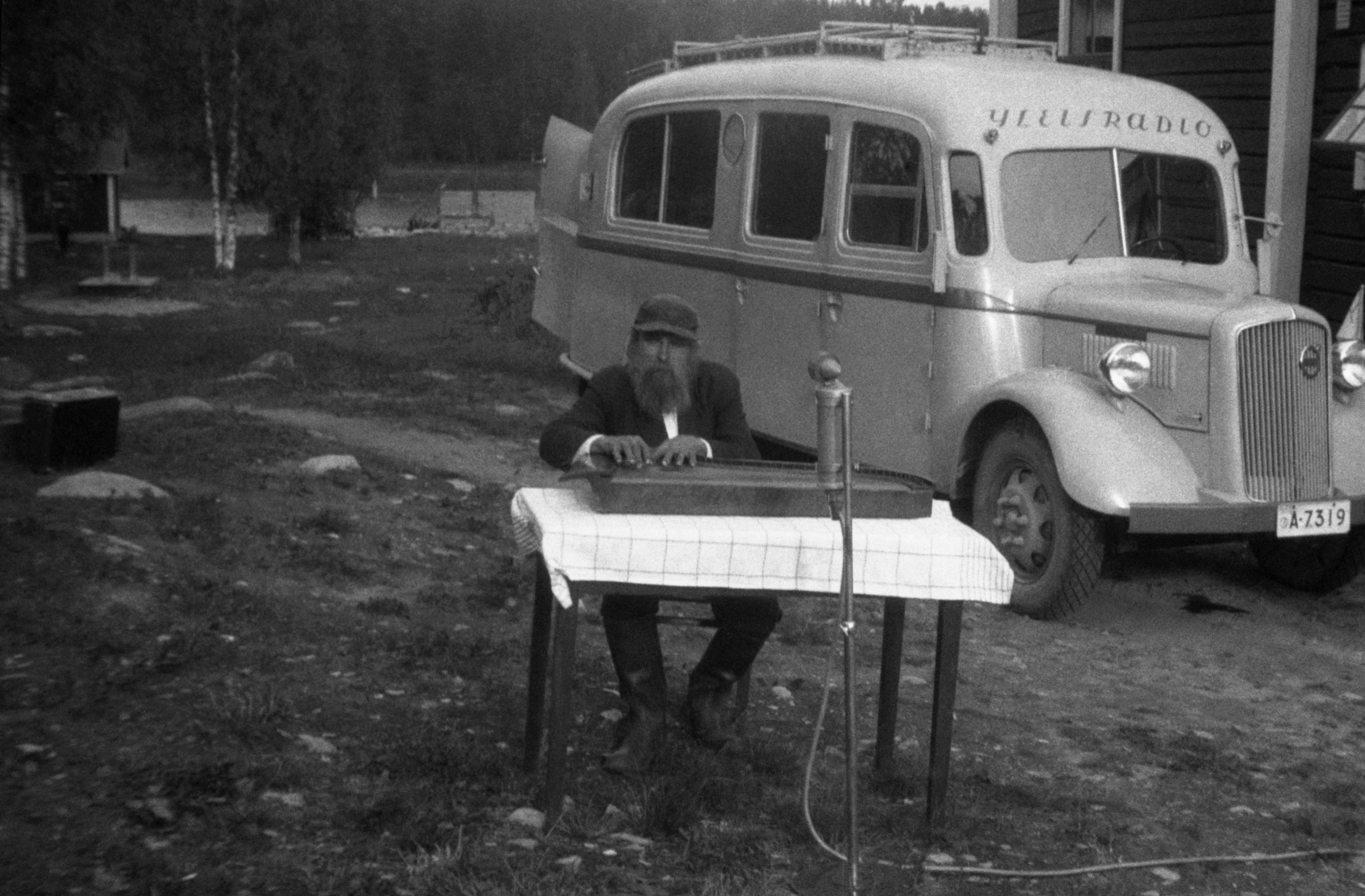
A man plays a kantele with his fingers in 1930s Finland

The kantele has a distinctive bell-like sound. The Finnish kantele generally has a diatonic tuning, though small kanteles with between 5 and 15 strings are often tuned to a gapped mode, missing a seventh and with the lowest pitched strings tuned to a fourth below the tonic, as a drone. Players hold the kantele in their laps or on a small table. There are two main playing techniques, either plucking the strings with the fingers or strumming unstopped strings (sometimes with a matchstick). Small kanteles and concert kanteles have different, though related, repertoires.

== Music ==
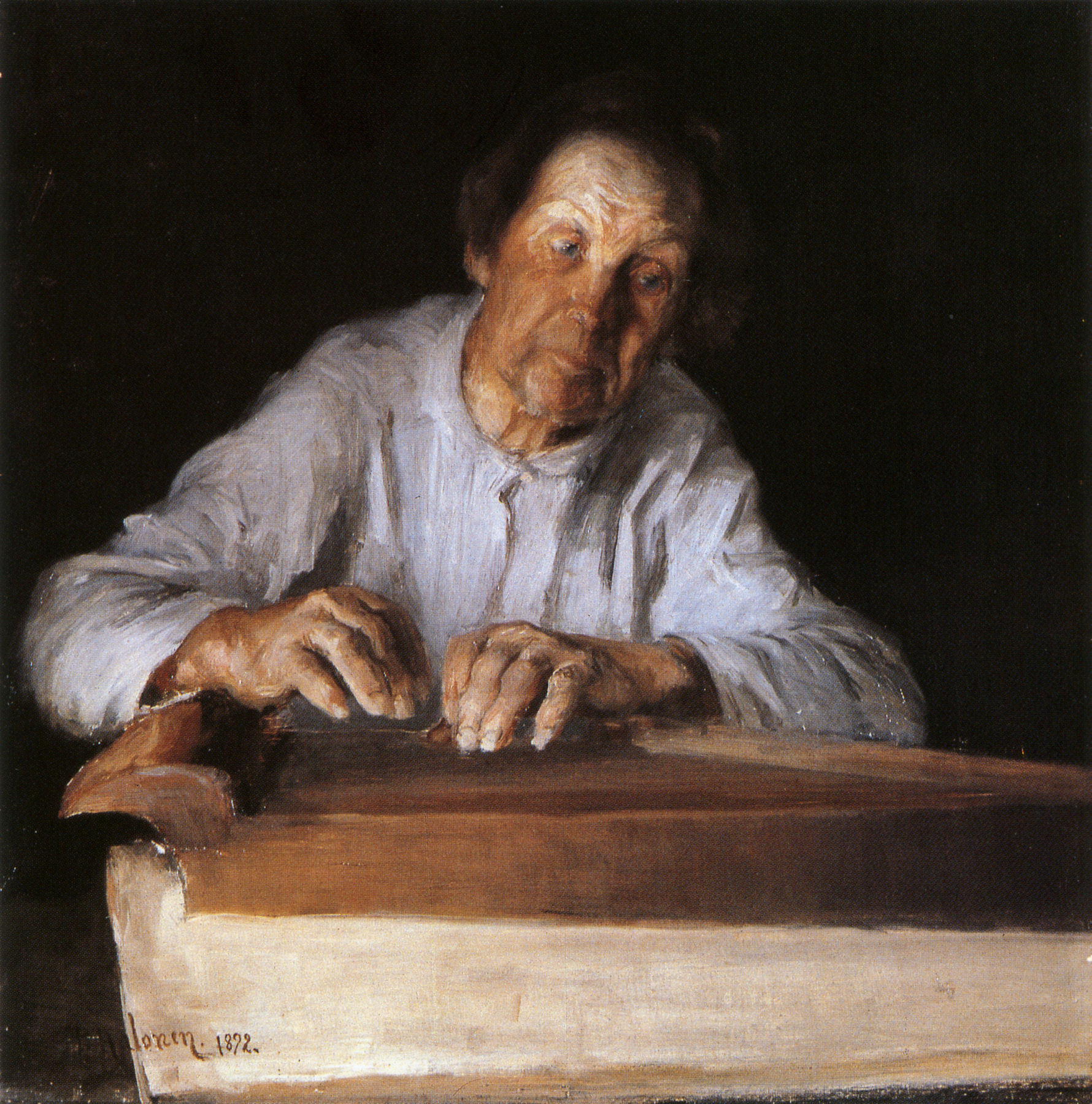
The Kantele Player by Pekka Halonen, 1892

There have been strong developments for the kantele in Finland since the mid-20th century, beginning with the efforts of modern players such as Martti Pokela in the 1950s and 1960s. Education for playing the instrument starts in schools and music institutes up to conservatories and the Sibelius Academy, the only music university in Finland and the site of significant doctoral research into traditional, western classical and electronic music. A Finnish luthiery, Koistinen Kantele, has also developed an electric kantele, employing pickups similar to those on electric guitars, which has gained popularity amongst Finnish heavy metal musicians such as Amorphis. American harpist Sylvan Grey has recorded two albums of Kantele music featuring her own compositions.

== Legendary history ==
In Finland's national epic, Kalevala, the mage Väinämöinen makes the first kantele from the jawbone of a giant pike and a few hairs from Hiisi's stallion (sung excerpt, excerpt lyrics). The music it makes draws all the forest creatures near to wonder at its beauty.

Later, after grieving at the loss of his kantele, Väinämöinen makes another one from birch, strung with the hair of a willing maiden, and its magic proves equally profound. It is the gift the eternal mage leaves behind when he departs Kaleva at the advent of Christianity.

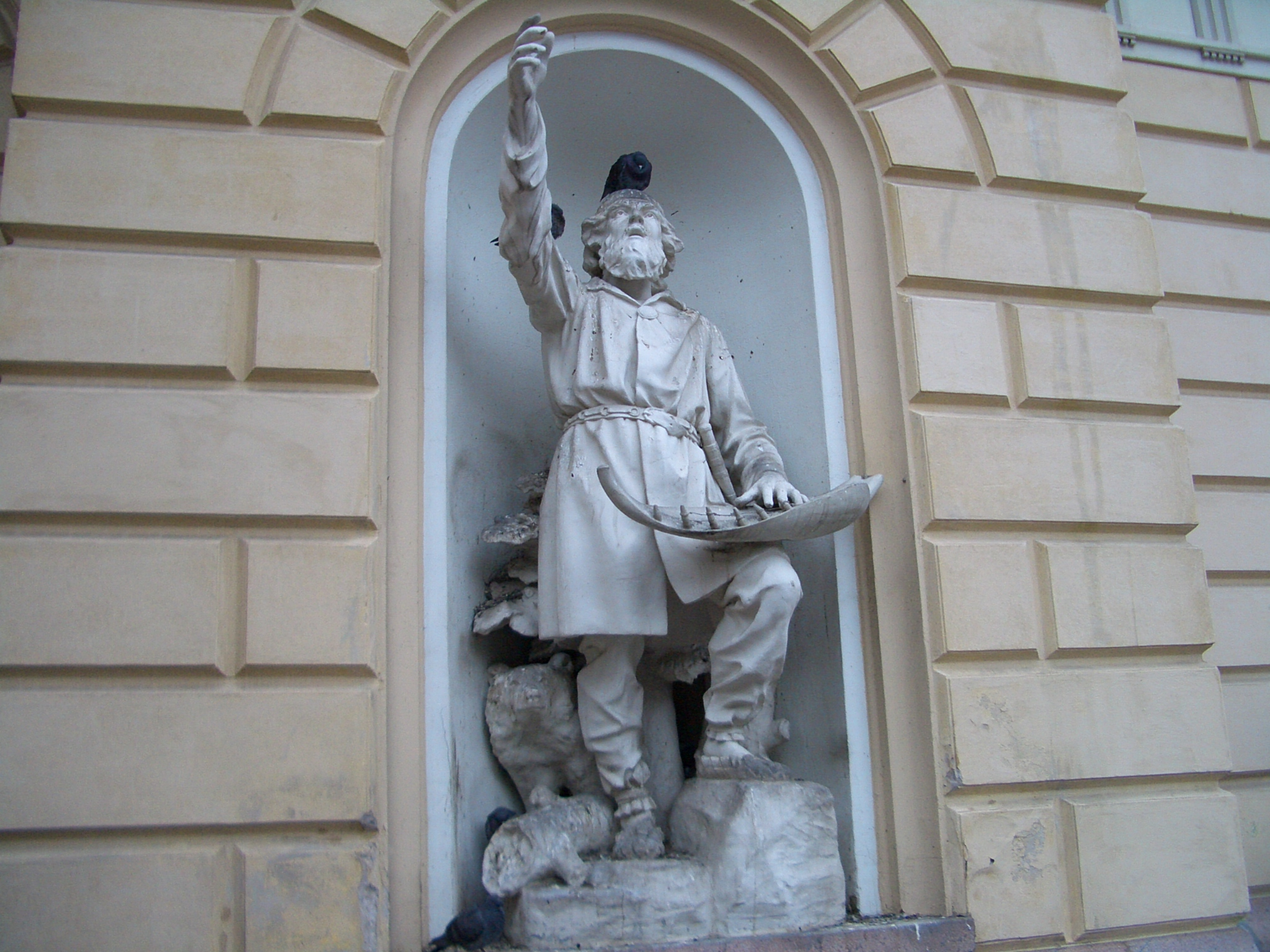
Robert Stigell's 1888 sculpture at Vanha Ylioppilastalo (Old Student House) in Helsinki depicts Väinämöinen with the first kantele, made of a giant pike's jawbone, as told in the Kalevala national epic.

Three kanteles in the coat of arms of Ilomantsi

== See also ==
- Category:Kantele players
- Kanteletar
- Psaltery
- Qanun, plucked string instrument similar to the kantele, originating from ancient Assyria and still widely played in Middle East, Central Asia, North Africa, Caucasus, Turkey, and Ukraine.
