= Gusli =

Slavic stringed instrument

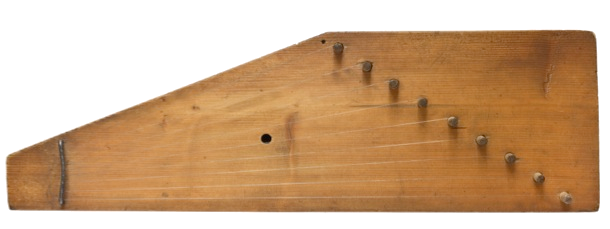
- Krylovidnye gusli
- Classification: Simple chordophone
- Hornbostel–Sachs classification: 315.2 (Trough zither with resonator)

Playing range
- varies Russian traditional tuning: E3 A3 H3 C4 D4 E4 F4 G4 A4

Related instruments
- Kantele; Kannel; Kokles; Kanklės; Zither

The gusli (Russian: гусли, Russian pronunciation: [ˈɡuslʲɪ]) or husla (Ukrainian: гусла, husla) is the oldest East Slavic multi-string plucked instrument, belonging to the zither family, due to its strings being parallel to its resonance board. Its roots lie in Veliky Novgorod in the Novgorodian Republic. It has its relatives in Europe and throughout the world: kantele/kannel in Finland, kannel in Estonia, kanklės in Lithuania, kokles in Latvia, Zither in Germany, citera in the Czech Republic, and psalterium in France. Furthermore, the kanun has been found in Arabic countries, and the autoharp, in the United States. It is also related to such ancient instruments as Chinese gu zheng, which has a thousand-year history, and its Japanese relative koto. A stringed musical instrument called guslim is listed as one of the Me in ancient Sumer.

== Etymology ==
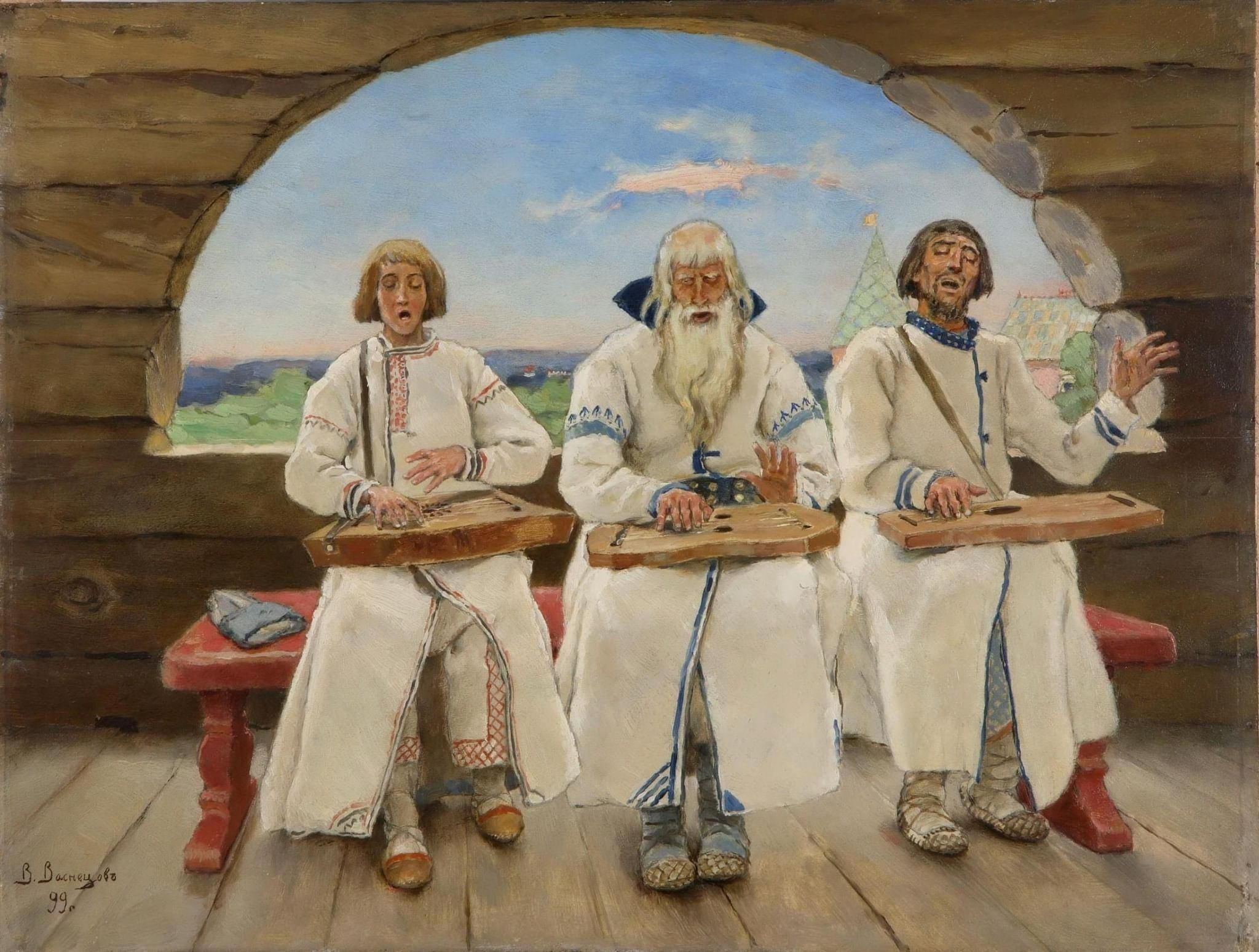
"Gusli musicians" by Viktor Vasnetsov, 1899

The term gusli derives from the verb *gǫsti (make sound, howl, play music) with the suffix *slь (from Proto-Indo-European *-trom). In the times of the Kievan Rus', the term gusli is believed to have simply referred to any generic stringed instrument. The root of the term comes from a word meaning "make sound in the wind." The term was eventually associated with the trapezoidal gusli-psaltyry (which may have originated in Byzantium).

== History ==
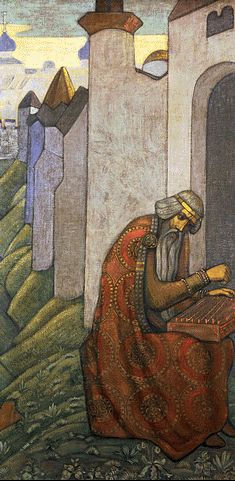
Boyan playing a gusli, by Nicholas Roerich

The gusli is one of the oldest musical instruments that have played an important role in Russian music culture. Vertkov states that the first mentions of the gusli date back to 591 AD to a treatise by the Greek historian Theophylact Simocatta which describes the instrument being used by Slavs from the area of the later Kievan Rus' kingdom. However, it is not exactly clear what instrument was meant by that word, because in Old Slavic or Old Russian "gusli" was used to refer to any stringed instrument. The first documented gusli were recorded in 1170 in Veliky Novgorod in Novgorodian Rus'. The Greek historian Theophan also mentioned the gusli. During the war at the end of the 6th century, the Greeks took Slavonic prisoners and found a musical instrument named the Gusli. This corresponds to what the Arabic authors Al-Masudi and Ibn-Dasta mentioned in the 10th century.

The gusli are thought to have been the instrument used by the legendary Boyan (a singer of tales) described in the Lay of Igor's campaign. A notable player of that instrument named Mitusa is also mentioned in the Galician-Volhynian Chronicle. Commonly used by the wandering skomorokh musicians and entertainers, gusli are also present in Old East Slavic bylinas as the favourite musical instrument of some epic heroes (bogatyrs).

In Ukraine, the husla or gusli remained in popular use for a longer period than in Russia. In the 18th century a school of husla players existed in Hlukhiv, providing musicians for the Russian imperial court. According to 19th-century Ukrainian author Panteleimon Kulish, husla had once been a usual accompaniment for older nobles, but by his time had become an instrument used mostly by priests.

== Archaeology ==
Three preserved fragments of gusli have been discovered by archaeologists in the territory of modern-day Poland, eight in Veliky Novgorod, and one in Zvenyhorod, Ukraine.

== Types ==
Folk Gusli have from eleven to thirty-six gut or metal strings, tuned diatonically.

There were two main forms:

- helmet-shaped (Shlemovidnye gusli – Russian: Шлемовидные гусли)
- wing-shaped (Krylovidnye gusli).

=== Shlemovidnye gusli ===
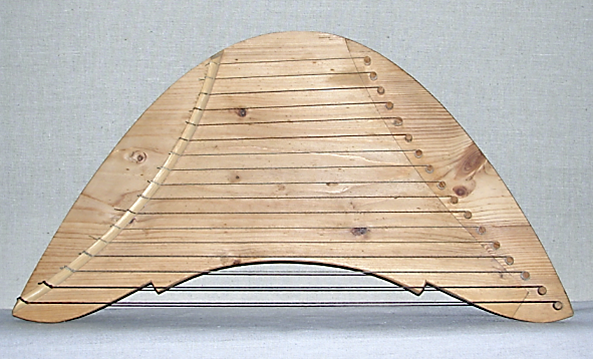
Reproduction of 14th-century gusli, a helmet-shaped gusli.

Shlemovidnye gusli (Helmet-shaped gusli; Russian: Шлемовидные гусли) is a variety of Gusli held by the musician on his knees, so that the strings are horizontal, the resonator body under them. He uses his left hand to mute unnecessary strings and thus form chords, while strumming all the strings with his right hand. The instrument was spread in southern and western regions of Kievan Rus'.

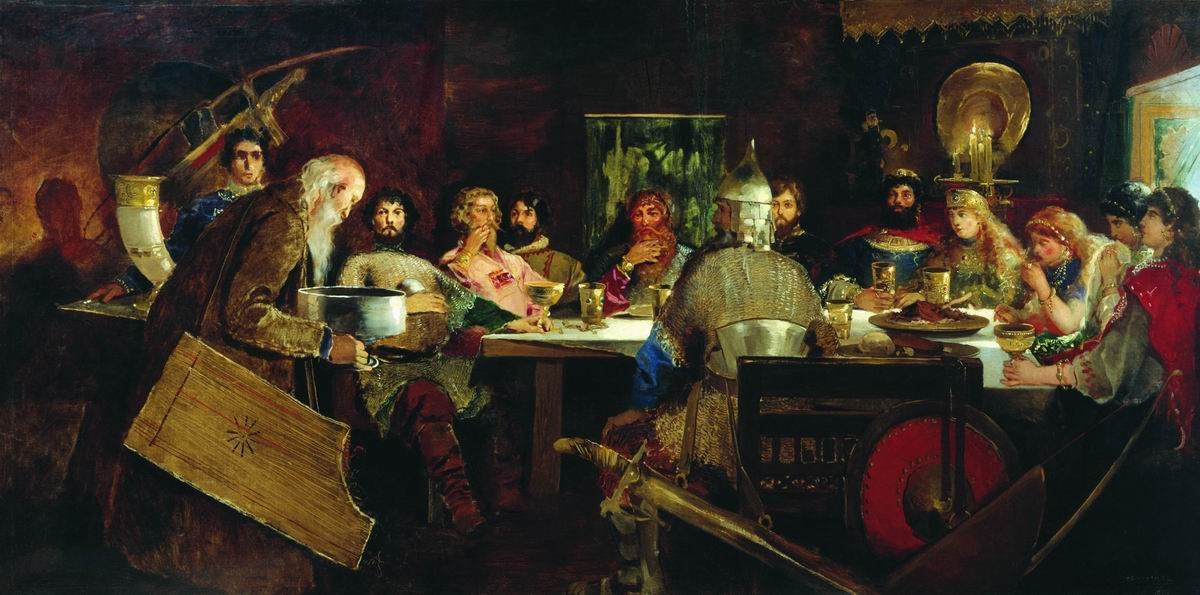
Painting of a feast attended by Vladimir the Great and certain of the bogatyri at which a gusli is being played

=== Krylovidnye gusli ===
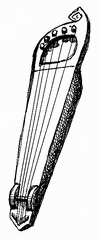
Krylovidnye (wing-shaped) gusli

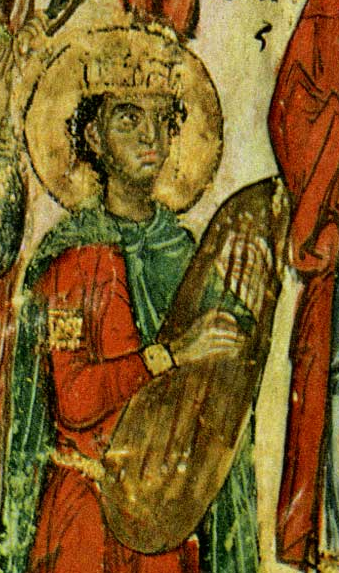
Man playing a lyre-shaped gusli (Russian: Лирообразные гусли) or rotte (lyre).

Krylovidnye gusli ("wing-shaped gusli"; Russian: Крыловидные гусли) is much smaller, and has more resemblance to Baltic psaltery such as the kankles, kokles, kannel and kantele. They are held much more like modern guitars (although the strings are still muted by the left hand through a special opening in the instrument's body). This modification was more prevalent in northern parts of Russia, especially Novgorod and Pskov.

=== Keyboard Gusli ===
The Keyboard Gusli ["Claviroobraznie Gusli" | (Russian: Клавирообразные гусли)] is a heavily strung 19th-century variant with an iron frame, supported on a stand or with table legs. It has a one-octave piano-type chromatic keyboard. Pressing a key raises the dampers on all strings of that note. Pressing the keys for a chord enables its arpeggiated execution.

== Related instruments ==
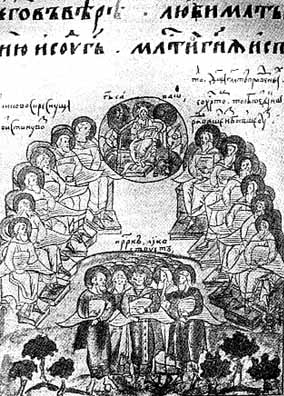
Gusli players. Illustration from a Bible dating back to 1648AD

A number of Slavic folk music instruments have names which are related to Gusli such as the Czech violin housle and the Balkan one-stringed fiddle gusle. In western Ukraine and Belarus, husli can also refer to a fiddle or even a ducted flute. The violin-like variant of the instrument is also related to the South Slavic gusle.

The psaltery variant is related to the zither. It is also related to the Lithuanian kanklės, the Latvian kokles, the Estonian kannel and the Finnish kantele. Together these instruments make up the family known as Baltic psalteries.

A related instrument is the tsymbaly, a hammered dulcimer.

In Ukraine, it is thought that the gusli may have influenced the development of the multi-stringed bandura, which largely replaced it in the nineteenth century.

== Modern Russian performers ==
- Olga Glazova
- Elena Frolova
- Olga Shishkina
- Alexander Matochkin
- Alexandra Sakovich
- Alexey Belkin

== See also ==
- Ethnic Russian music
- Sergey Nikolaevich Starostin
