= Box zither =

Class of musical instruments

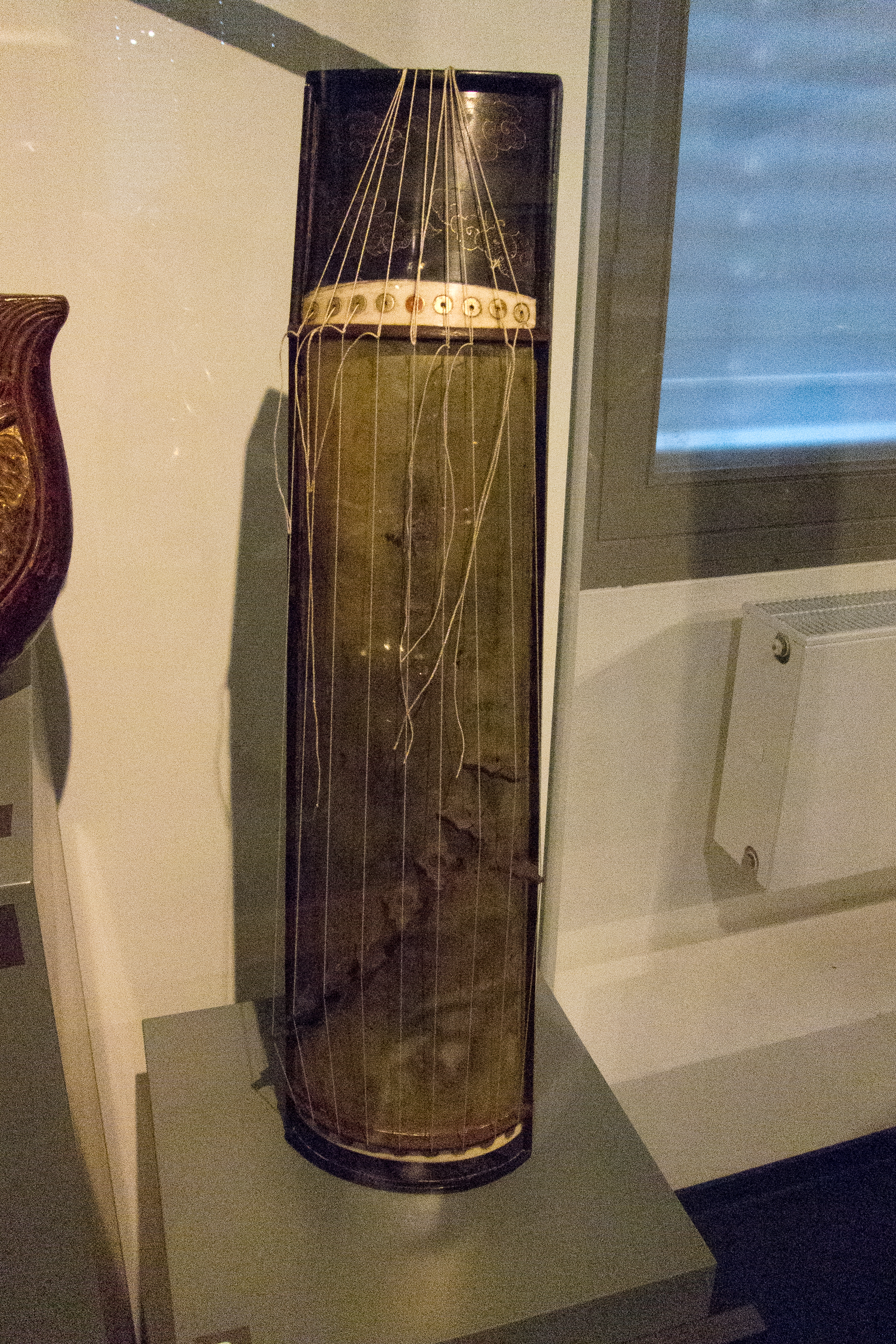
A guzheng box zither from China

The box zither is a class of stringed instrument in the form of a trapezoid-shaped or rectangular, hollow box. The strings of the box zither are either struck with light hammers or plucked. Among the most popular plucked box zithers are the Arab qānūn and its various derivatives, including the harpsichord (a plucked zither controlled by a keyboard).

Historically various people (Lithuanians, Latvians, Livonians, Estonians, Finns, northwest Russians) have played related box-zither type instruments (the so-called Baltic psaltery) in the south east vicinity of the Baltic Sea for centuries. In the United States the autoharp is a prominent plucked box zither.

== See also ==
- Zither
- Baltic psaltery
