= Sawai (surname) =

Sawai (written: 沢井 lit. "swamp well") is a Japanese surname. Notable people with the surname include:

- Anna Sawai (born 1992), Japanese actress
- Eagle Sawai (born 1967), Japanese professional wrestler
- Gloria Sawai (1932–2011), American-Canadian author
- Hikaru Sawai (born 1964), Japanese koto player and composer, son of Kazue and Tadao Sawai
- Kazue Sawai (1941–2026), Japanese koto player and composer
- Kenichi Sawai (1903–1988), Japanese martial artist and army officer
- Koji Sawai (born 1955), Japanese anime director and artist
- Miku Sawai (born 1993), Japanese musician
- Miyuu Sawai (born 1987), Japanese actress
- Ryosuke Sawai (born 1978), Japanese baseball player
- Sawai Atsuhiro (born 1939), Japanese yoga practitioner
- Shinichiro Sawai (1938–2021), Japanese filmmaker
- Tadao Sawai (1938–1997), Japanese koto player and composer
- Yoshio Sawai (born 1977), Japanese manga artist
