= Tomonoura =

Japanese port located in Fukuyama

Coordinates: 34°22′51″N 133°22′48″E

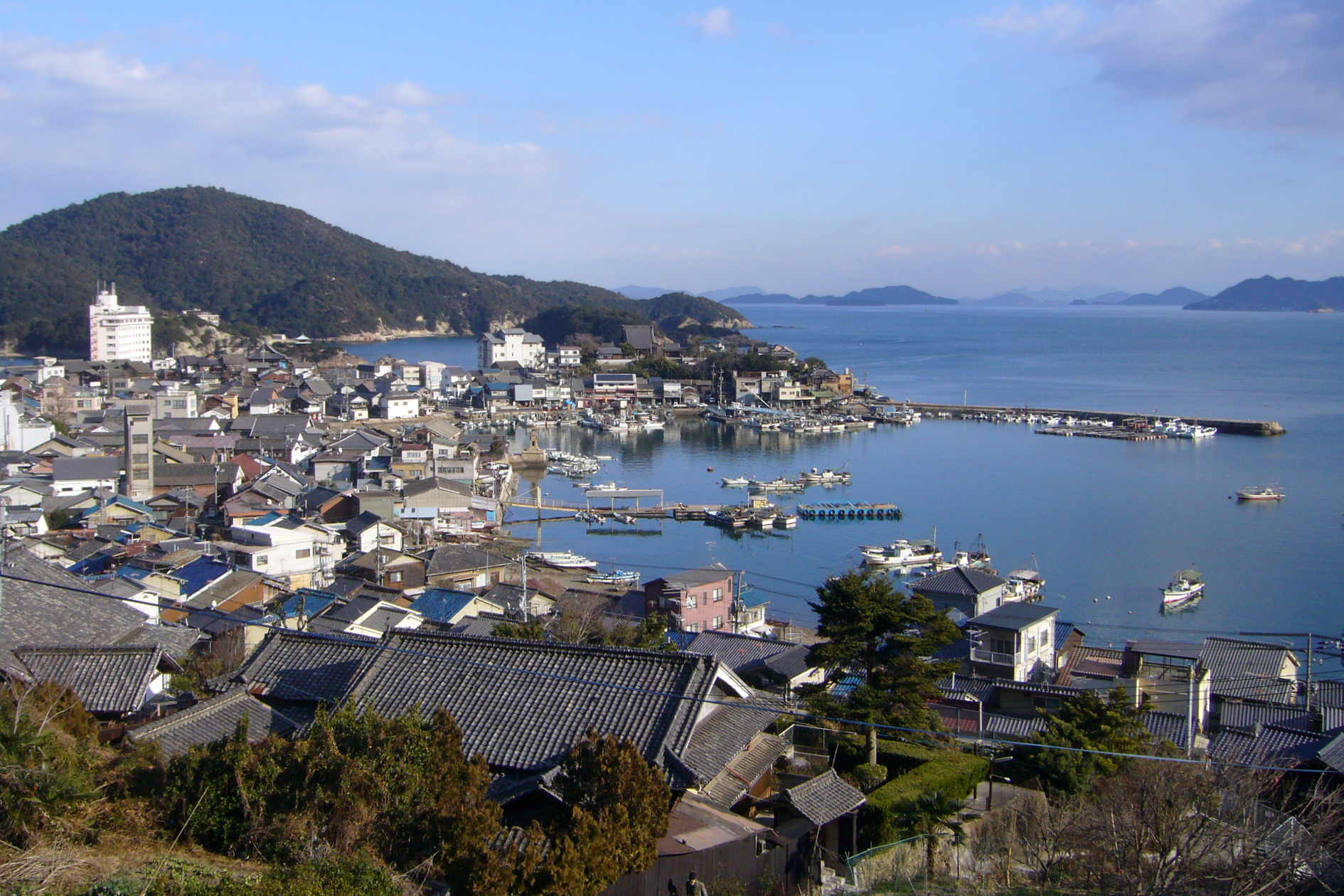
Tomonoura

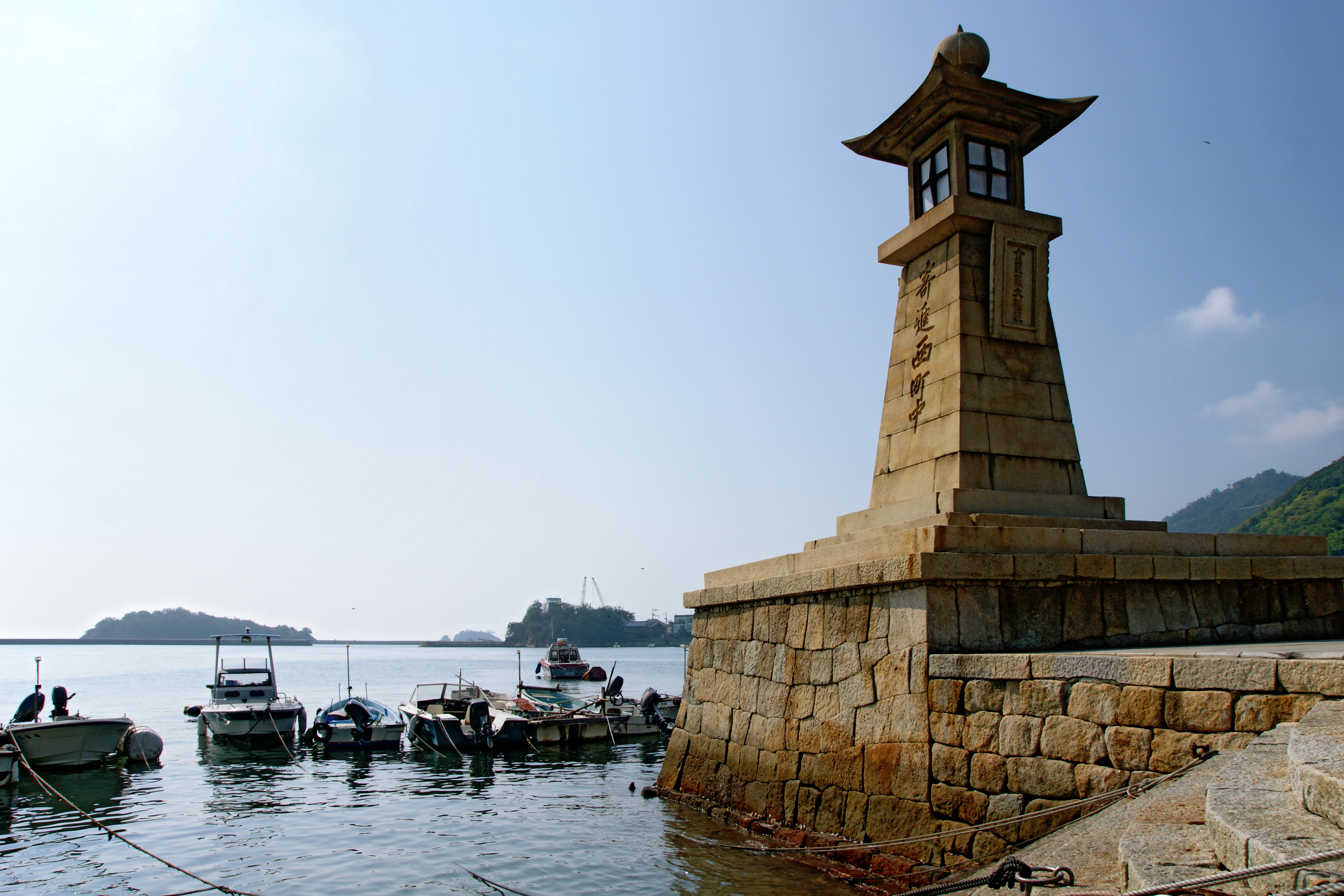
Lighthouse

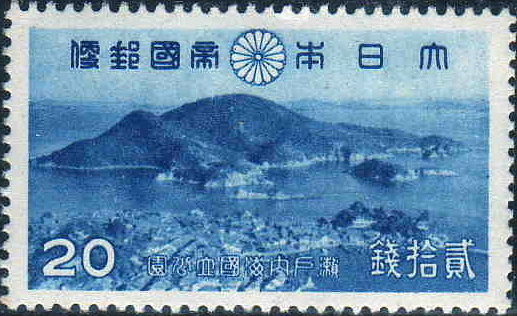
Tomonoura featured on a 1939 stamp of Japan.

Tomonoura (鞆の浦), formerly known as Tomonotsu (鞆の津), is a port in the Tomo ward of Fukuyama, Hiroshima Prefecture, Japan. It stands on the southern point of the Numakuma Peninsula, 14 kilometers south of Fukuyama Station, with a population of about 3,500 people as of 2017.

Tomonoura has been a prosperous port since ancient times. Its unique circular harbor was preserved even after modern port facilities were introduced. Tomonoura lies within Tomokōen (鞆公園), which forms part of the Setonaikai National Park. In 2007, the port was listed as one of the top 100 scenic municipalities in Japan and its harbor was listed as one of the top 100 historical natural features in Japan.

There are many historical temples and shrines around Tomonoura, and the area is famous for red sea bream (真鯛, Madai) fishing.

== History ==
- 8 poems about Tomonoura are to be found in the oldest collection of Japanese poems, the Man'yōshū, compiled in the Tenpyō-hōji era.
- Jyoganji Temple was established by Saichō and Ioji Temple was established by Kūkai during the Heian period.
- According to the Engishiki (延喜式, "Procedures of the Engi Era"), mainly completed in 927 A.D., Yasaka Shrine in Kyoto had its origins in Tomonoura's Nunakuma Shrine (沼名前神社) during the Heian period.
- After the Battle of Tatarahama (1336), Emperor Kōgon visited Tomonoura and gave a memorial written for Nitta Yoshisada to Ashikaga Takauji.
- The Five-story pagodas of Jyoganji Temple was destroyed during the Battle of Tomo between the Northern Court and the Southern Court in the Nanboku-chō period.
- The former Tomo Castle was built by the Mōri clan during the Sengoku period.
- After Ashikaga Yoshiaki was banished from Kyoto by Oda Nobunaga, Ashikaga formed the Tomo Bakufu with the Ise clan, the Ueno clan and the Odachi clan, and with the support of the Mōri clan.
- Fukushima Masanori of Bingo Province started rebuilding Tomo Castle during the Edo period, but construction was halted by order of Tokugawa Ieyasu.
- Mizuno Katsushige of Fukuyama Domain was opened the government office at the site of Tomo Castle.
- Tomonoura was the site of the sinking of the Iroha Maru, a ship belonging to Sakamoto Ryōma.
- Railway service between Tomo Station and Fukuyama Station started in 1913, but the line was closed in 1954.
- The Setonaikai National Park, which includes Tomonoura, was founded on 16 March 1934.
- Tomonoura was once given the nickname Shio machi minato which means "port of waiting for tides".

== Preserving the historic harbor ==
The local government had a plan to build a bridge over the scenic harbor for a bypass road, which caused conflict with members of the local community concerned about the preservation of the historic harbor. The plan has now been overturned by the Hiroshima District Court. The plan led to the town being included in the World Monuments Watch by the World Monuments Fund in 2002 and 2004. This organization later helped to restore a historic merchant house in the town with financial support from American Express. The 19th-century residence, known as Uoya-Manzo has since become an information center and guesthouse for visitors.

== In the arts and literature ==
=== Poetry ===
Man'yōshū - (7th to 8th century) (8 poems, including 2 Ōtomo no Tabito's poems)

=== Art ===
- "Seto Inland Sea, Tomonotsu, 1940"; woodblock print by Tsuchiya Koitsu (土屋光逸), a sunset scene of ships in the harbor at Tomonoura.

=== Music ===
- Haru no Umi, composed by Michio Miyagi - Koto music - (1929)
- Tomonoura Bojō, enka song by Misaki Iwasa (2014) (The music video was shot in Tomonoura, and the song is about feelings and the harbor.)

=== Books ===
- Tomonotsu Chakaiki (1986), a novel by Masuji Ibuse about the life of Toyotomi Hideyoshi
- 鞆の浦殺人事件 (Murder in Tomonoura, 1988), a detective novel by Yasuo Uchida

=== Photography exhibitions ===
尾道への旅 (A Journey to Onomichi, 2006) by Wim Wenders

=== Films ===
- 白椿 (White Camellia, 2007), directed by Masatoshi Akihara, starring Hiroko Hatano, based on a story about a family in Tomo by Yumeno Kyūsaku
- 崖の上のポニョ (Ponyo, 2008), directed by Hayao Miyazaki, who stayed in Tomonoura for two months in 2005
- The Wolverine, 2013, directed by James Mangold, starring Hugh Jackman, was filmed in Tomonoura

== See also ==
- Setonaikai National Park
- Seto Inland Sea
- Ponyo
