= Hifumi Shimoyama =

Japanese composer (1930–2023)

Hifumi Shimoyama (Japanese: 下山 一二三 Shimoyama Hifumi; 21 June 1930 – 16 December 2023) was a Japanese composer of contemporary concert music.

== Life and career ==
Shimoyama was born in Hirosaki, Aomori Prefecture on 21 June 1930. From the 1960s, Shimoyama's music has been regularly featured on World Music Days festivals across Europe and Asia, and sponsored by the International Society for Contemporary Music (ISCM). He was the founder of GROUP 20.5, the internationally recognized group of Japanese avant garde composers. Shimoyama died on 16 December 2023, at the age of 93.

== Selected compositions ==
Shimoyama's works are published by Academia Music, Edizioni Suvini Zerboni, Japan Federation of Composers, Mieroprint, Ongaku no Tomo-sha.

Orchestral

- Reflection (リフレクション) for 3 string orchestras (1968)
- Zone (ゾーン) for 16 string players (1970)
- Fūmon II (風紋II) for orchestra and tape (1974)
- Yūgenism (ユーゲニズム) for orchestra (1988–1989)
- Doubridge (だぶりっじ) for string orchestra (1995)

Concertante

- Wave (ウェーヴ) for cello, string ensemble, harp, piano and percussion (1972, revised 1998)
- Concerto for cello and orchestra (1984)
- Yūgenism No. 2 (ユーゲニズム第2番) for clarinet, string orchestra and percussion (1998)
- Concerto for violin and orchestra (2003)
- Knob (ノブ) for bass clarinet and 14 players

Chamber music

- String Quartet (1959)
- Structure (ストルクチュール) for 4 performers (2 violin, trumpet, bass clarinet, percussion) (1961)
- Dialogue (ダイアローグ) for cello and piano (1962)
- Dialogue (ダイアローグ) for 2 guitars (1963)
- Ceremony for cello solo (1969)
- Exorcism (エクソルシズム) for string quintet (1970)
- MSP for violin and piano (1972)
- Dialogue No. 2 (ダイアローグ第2番) for 2 guitars (1973)
- Transmigration (トランズマイグレーション) for percussion and double bass (1973)
- Fūmon IV (風紋IV) for 4 percussionists and tape (1974–1986)
- Chromophony (彩響 Saikyō) for orchestra (1979)
- Dialogue (ダイアローグ) for 2 percussionists (1979)
- Transmigration No. 2 (トランズマイグレーション第2番) for shakuhachi, cello and harp (1983–1984)
- Meditation (メディテーション) for cello and piano (1983)
- Oriental Wind for oboe, English horn, piano and percussion (1984)
- L.41°N, Homage to N (N氏へのオマージュ、北緯41度) for guitar (1987)
- Ikki no gekkei (一期の月影) for cello, 17-string koto and tape (1989)
- Fūmon VI (風紋VI) for clarinet, cello, percussion and tape (1994, revised 1997)
- Keikyō (谿響) for clarinet, double bass, percussion and tape (1994)
- Essay for recorder player (treble or tenor) with antique cymbals and wood chime (1998)
- Shinkyō (Deep Sound) (深響) for 2 double basses (2000)
- Amalgam (アマルガム) for shakuhachi, bass clarinet and piano (2008)
- Duplication (デュプリケーション) for viola and guitar (2009)
- Shinkyō (Deep Sound) No. 2 (深響第2番) for 6 double basses (2010)

Organ

- Landscape (情景) for organ (1992)
- Landscape No. 2 (情景第2番) for organ and percussion (1999)

Vocal

- Breath (息) for female voice, piano and percussion (1971)
- Catalysis (カタリシス) for voice, alto flute, bass trombone, cello and percussion (1976)
- Catalysis No. 2 (カタリシス第2番) for soprano, piano and percussion (1983)

Japanese instruments

- Catalysis No. 3 (カタリシス第3番) for shinobue (or shakuhachi), shamisen, koto and percussion (1983)
- Kannagi (巫覡) for shakuhachi, 2 kotos and 17-string koto (1983)
- Kaze no toh (風の塔) for shakuhachi, 20-string koto, percussion (1991)
- Monologue (モノローグ) for shamisen (sangen) (1991)
- Figure (フィギュール) for shakuhachi and percussion (2001–2002)

== Sources ==
- NUVO News
