= Cruzin =

Cruzin' may refer to:

== Music ==
- "Cruzin'", song by Kottonmouth Kings from Sunrise Sessions
- "Cruzin'", song by 8Ball & MJG from Ridin High
- "Cruzin'", song by Abraxas Pool
- "Cruzin'", song by MC Magic from Princess/Princesa
- "Cruzin'", song by Jackie Jackson from Be the One (album)
- "Cruzin'", song by Damizza
- "Cruzin'", song by Social Distortion from Live in Orange County
- "Cruzin'", song by Esham from Suspended Animation (Esham album)
- "Cruzin'", song by Currensy from Canal Street Confidential 2015

== Other ==
- Car Cruzin List of programs broadcast by MTV2 (Canada)
- Alvin Cruzin, person involved in 2017 Resorts World Manila attack
- Cruzin Cooler, Ride-on cooler
