= Sawai =

Sawai may refer to:

- Sawai (surname), a Japanese surname
- Sawai (title), a title of honor used in India
- Sawai language, a South Halmahera language of Austronesian stock spoken in Indonesia
- Sawai, Car Nicobar, a village in the Andaman and Nicobar Islands, India
- Sawai Station, a railway station in Ōme, Tokyo, Japan
- Manilkara kanosiensis, a tropical rainforest tree
