= Hiromi Ōta =

Japanese singer (1955–2026)

Hiromi Ōta 太田裕美
- Born: January 20, 1955; Tokyo, Japan
- Died: November 12, 2026 (aged 71) Tokyo, Japan
- Genre: Folk
- Occupations: Singer, songwriter
- Years active: 1974–2026
- Labels: Sony Music (1974–2006); Boundee (2009–2026)
- Website: https://www.sonymusic.co.jp/artist/HiromiOta/

Hiromi Ōta (太田 裕美 Ōta Hiromi, January 20, 1955 – November 12, 2026) was a Japanese singer. She was a popular singer who was considered an idol in Japan during the 1970s, and is thought to be representative of that era. She also collaborated with the composer-musician Ayuo and the Japanese koto player Kazue Sawai singing a unique blend of New Age, Classical and traditional Eastern music. Her collaborations with Ayuo were also released in the U.S. on the CD "Red Moon" on Tzadik label.

Ōta debuted in 1974. In 1975, she released "Momen no handkerchief", which became her trademark song.

She got married in 1985 and her name became Hiromi Fukuoka (福岡弘美).

Ōta would later often hold joint concerts with Shozo Ise and Masumi Ōno. She died on November 12, 2026 from breast cancer, at the age of 71.

== Discography ==
=== Albums ===
==== Studio albums ====
List of albums, with selected chart positions
Title	Album details	Peak positions
Title	Album details	JPN Oricon
Magokoro (まごころ)	Released: February 1, 1975; Label: CBS Sony; Formats: CD, LP, Cassette tape, digital download, streaming	45
Tanpenshuu (短編集)	Released: June 21, 1975; Label: CBS Sony; Formats: CD, LP, Cassette tape, digital download, streaming	41
Kokoro ga Kaze wo Hiita Hi (心が風邪をひいた日)	Released: December 5, 1975; Label: CBS Sony; Formats: CD, LP, Cassette tape, digital download, streaming	5
Tezukuri no Gashuu (手作りの画集)	Released: June 21, 1976; Label: CBS Sony; Formats: CD, LP, Cassette tape, digital download, streaming	3
12 Page no Shishuu (12ページの詩集)	Released: December 5, 1976; Label: CBS Sony; Formats: CD, LP, Cassette tape, digital download, streaming	9
Koktetissue (こけてぃっしゅ)	Released: July 1, 1977; Label: CBS Sony; Formats: CD, LP, Cassette tape, digital download, streaming	3
Senaka Awase Rendevouz (背中あわせのランデブー)	Released: February 25, 1978; Label: CBS Sony; Formats: CD, LP, Cassette tape, digital download, streaming	3
Elegance	Released: August 1, 1978; Label: CBS Sony; Formats: CD, LP, Cassette tape, digital download, streaming	13
Umi ga Naiteiru (海が泣いている)	Released: December 5, 1978; Label: CBS Sony; Formats: CD, LP, Cassette tape, digital download, streaming	13
Feelin' Summer	Released: June 1, 1979; Label: CBS Sony; Formats: CD, LP, Cassette tape, digital download, streaming	19
Little Concert	Released: December 5, 1979; Label: CBS Sony; Formats: CD, LP, Cassette tape, digital download, streaming	49
Omoide wo Oku Kimi wo Oku (思い出を置く 君を置く)	Released: July 1, 1980; Label: CBS Sony; Formats: CD, LP, Cassette tape, digital download, streaming	44
12 Gatsu no Tabibito (十二月の旅人)	Released: December 21, 1980; Label: CBS Sony; Formats: CD, LP, Cassette tape, digital download, streaming	-
Gokigen Ikaga (ごきげんいかが)	Released: August 1, 1981; Label: CBS Sony; Formats: CD, LP, Cassette tape, digital download, streaming	47
Kimi to Aruita Seishun (君と歩いた青春)	Released: December 21, 1981; Label: CBS Sony; Formats: CD, LP, Cassette tape, digital download, streaming	-
Far East	Released: March 21, 1983; Label: CBS Sony; Formats: CD, LP, Cassette tape, digital download, streaming	-
I do, You do	Released: October 1, 1983; Label: CBS Sony; Formats: CD, LP, Cassette tape, digital download, streaming	-
Tamatebako	Released: June 21, 1984; Label: CBS Sony; Formats: CD, LP, Cassette tape, digital download, streaming	-
Tamashii no Period (魂のピリオド)	Released: July 1, 1998; Label: Sony; Formats: CD, digital download, streaming	-
Kamisama no Itazura (神様のいたずら)	Released: April 21, 1999; Label: Sony; Formats: CD, digital download, streaming	-
Candy	Released: November 3, 1999; Label: Sony; Formats: CD, digital download, streaming	-
Hajimari wa Magokoro Datta (始まりは“まごころ”だった)	Released: November 22, 2006; Label: Sony; Formats: CD, digital download, streaming	-
Hiromi Deluxe (ヒロミ☆デラックス)	Released: November 1, 2019; Label: Sony; Formats: CD, digital download, streaming	45

==== Cover albums ====
List of albums, with selected chart positions
Title	Album details	Peak positions
Title	Album details	JPN Oricon
Donjarahoi (どんじゃらほい)	Released: April 1, 1992; Label: CBS Sony; Formats: CD, digital download, streaming	-
Tutumikko	Released: April 2, 2014; Label: CBS Sony; Formats: CD, digital download, streaming	-

==== Live albums ====
List of albums, with selected chart positions
Title	Album details	Peak positions
Title	Album details	JPN Oricon
Hiromic World/First Live Album	Released: February 25, 1985; Label: CBS Sony; Formats: LP, Cassette Tape	-

==== Compilation albums ====
List of albums, with selected chart positions
Title	Album details	Peak positions
Title	Album details	JPN Oricon
Oota Hiromi Hit Zenkyokushuu (太田裕美ヒット全曲集)	Released: February 1, 1975; Label: CBS Sony; Formats: LP, Cassette tape	-
Best of Best Oota Hiromi no Subete (Best of Best 太田裕美のすべて)	Released: June 1, 1976; Label: CBS Sony; Formats: LP, Cassette tape	-
Oota Hiromi Hit Zenkyokushuu (太田裕美ヒット全曲集)	Released: November 1, 1976; Label: CBS Sony; Formats: LP, Cassette tape	-
Kettei Ban Oota Hiromi (決定盤 太田裕美)	Released: July 1, 1977; Label: CBS Sony; Formats: LP, Cassette tape	-
Hit Zenkyokushuu/Hiromi Selection Oota Hiromi (ヒット全曲集／ヒロミ セレクション 太田裕美)	Released: November 1, 1977; Label: CBS Sony; Formats: LP, Cassette tape	-
The Best Oota Hiromi (THE BEST 太田裕美)	Released: November 1, 1981; Label: CBS Sony; Formats: LP, Cassette tape, CD	-
Oota Hiromi Best Collection (太田裕美 ベスト・コレクション)	Released: 1985; Label: CBS Sony; Formats: LP, Cassette tape, CD	-
Golden J-pop The Best Oota Hiromi (GOLDEN J-POP/THE BEST 太田裕美)	Released: November 21, 1997; Label: CBS Sony; Formats: 2-CD	-
2000 Best Oota Hiromi (2000 BEST 太田裕美)	Released: May 24, 2000; Label: CBS Sony; Formats: CD	-
Dream Price 1000 Oota Hiromi Momen no Handchief (DREAM PRICE 1000 太田裕美 木綿のハンカチーフ)	Released: October 11, 2001; Label: CBS Sony; Formats: CD	-
Golden Best Oota Hiromi Complete Single Collection (GOLDEN☆BEST 太田裕美 コンプリート・シングル・コレクション)	Released: June 19, 2002; Label: CBS Sony; Formats: 2-CD	-
Oota Hiromi Singles 1974-1978 (太田裕美 Singles 1974-1978)	Released: November 19, 2003; Label: CBS Sony; Formats: CD	-
Oota Hiromi Singles 1979-2001 (太田裕美 Singles 1978-2001)	Released: March 10, 2004; Label: CBS Sony; Formats: CD	-
Oota Hiromi Best of Best (太田裕美 ベスト・オブ・ベスト)	Released: October 18, 2006; Label: CBS Sony; Formats: CD	-
999 Best Oota Hiromi (999 Best 太田裕美)	Released: October 18, 2006; Label: CBS Sony; Formats: CD	-
Oota Hiromi Super Best (太田裕美 スーパー・ベスト)	Released: November 24, 2009; Label: CBS Sony; Formats: CD	-
Golden Best Oota Hiromi (GOLDEN☆BEST 太田裕美)	Released: June 29, 2011; Label: CBS Sony; Formats: CD	-

==== Box sets ====
List of albums, with selected chart positions
Title	Album details	Peak positions
Title	Album details	JPN Oricon
Oota Hiromi no Kiseki: First Quarter (太田裕美の軌跡 〜First Quarter〜)	Released: 1999; Label: CBS Sony; Formats: 6-CD	-
Oota Hiromi Gift Box (太田裕美 GIFT BOX)	Released: 2006; Label: CBS Sony; Formats: 4-CD	-
Oota Hiromi All Songs Collection (太田裕美 オール・ソングス・コレクション)	Released: 2008; Label: CBS Sony; Formats: 25-CD	-

=== Singles ===
List of singles, with selected chart positions
Year	Single	Peak chart positions	Label	Formats
Year	Single	JPN Physical	Label	Formats
1974	"Amadare" （雨だれ)	14	CBS Sony	CD, LP, Cassette, digital download, streaming
1975	"Tanpopo" （たんぽぽ)	33	CBS Sony	CD, LP, Cassette, digital download, streaming
1975	"Yuuyake" （夕焼け)	37	CBS Sony	CD, LP, Cassette, digital download, streaming
1975	"Momen no Handchief" （木綿のハンカチーフ(ja))	2	CBS Sony	CD, LP, Cassette, digital download, streaming
1976	"Akai Highheel" （赤いハイヒール)	2	CBS Sony	CD, LP, Cassette, digital download, streaming
1976	"Saigo no Hitowa" （最後の一葉)	5	CBS Sony	CD, LP, Cassette, digital download, streaming
1977	"Shiawase Miman" （しあわせ未満)	4	CBS Sony	CD, LP, Cassette, digital download, streaming
1977	"Renai Yuugi" （恋愛遊戯)	13	CBS Sony	CD, LP, Cassette, digital download, streaming
1977	"Kugatsu no Ame" （九月の雨)	7	CBS Sony	CD, LP, Cassette, digital download, streaming
1977	"Koibitotachi no 100 no Itsuwari" （恋人たちの100の偽り)	27	CBS Sony	CD, LP, Cassette, digital download, streaming
1978	"Shitsuren Majutsushi" （失恋魔術師)	22	CBS Sony	CD, LP, Cassette, digital download, streaming
1978	"Doll" （ドール)	21	CBS Sony	CD, LP, Cassette, digital download, streaming
1978	"Furimukeba Yesterday" （振り向けばイエスタディ)	51	CBS Sony	CD, LP, Cassette, digital download, streaming
1979	"Aozora no Kageri" （青空の翳り)	56	CBS Sony	CD, LP, Cassette, digital download, streaming
1979	"Single Girl" （シングル・ガール)	53	CBS Sony	CD, LP, Cassette, digital download, streaming
1979	"Glass no Sedai" （ガラスの世代)	72	CBS Sony	CD, LP, Cassette, digital download, streaming
1980	"Minamikaze" （南風)	22	CBS Sony	CD, LP, Cassette, digital download, streaming
1980	"Tasogare Kaigan" （黄昏海岸)	76	CBS Sony	CD, LP, Cassette, digital download, streaming
1980	"Saraba Siberia no Tetsudou" （さらばシベリア鉄道)	70	CBS Sony	CD, LP, Cassette, digital download, streaming
1981	"Koi no Half Moon" （恋のハーフムーン)	81	CBS Sony	CD, LP, Cassette, digital download, streaming
1981	"Kimi to Aruita Seishun" （君と歩いた青春)	80	CBS Sony	CD, LP, Cassette, digital download, streaming
1983	"Lonely People II" （ロンリィ・ピーポーII)	-	CBS Sony	CD, LP, Cassette, digital download, streaming
1983	"Mangetsu no Yoru Kiminchi he Ittayo" （満月の夜 君んちへ行ったよ)	108	CBS Sony	CD, LP, Cassette, digital download, streaming
1984	"Aoi Mi no Hitomi" （青い実の瞳)	-	CBS Sony	CD, LP, Cassette, digital download, streaming
1984	"Ame no Too ga Kikoeru" （雨の音が聞こえる)	-	CBS Sony	CD, LP, Cassette, digital download, streaming
1993	"Hajiemte no Love Letter" （はじめてのラブレター)	-	CBS Sony	CD, digital download, streaming
1994	"Virgin Kara Hajimeyou" （Virginから始めよう)	-	CBS Sony	CD, digital download, streaming
1996	"First Lady ni Narou" （ファーストレディになろう)	-	CBS Sony	CD, digital download, streaming
2001	"Papa to Anata no Kage Boushi" （パパとあなたの影ぼうし)	-	CBS Sony	CD, digital download, streaming
2009	"Hatsukoi" （初恋)	-	Boundee	CD, digital download, streaming
2011	"Konpeito" （金平糖)	-	Boundee	CD, digital download, streaming
2019	"Suteki no Kiseki/Sakura Tsukiyo" （ステキのキセキ／桜月夜)	-	Boundee	LP, CD, digital download, streaming

== Videography ==
=== Live video albums ===
No.	Release	Title	Formats
1st	21 March 1985	Hiromic World	LaserDisc, VHS, Betamax
2nd	20 August 2014	Ama Onna no Ongaeshi Tutumikko 2014 Live	DVD
