= Rin' =

Japanese pop group

- Origin: Geidai, Japan
- Genre: Pop/Traditional Japanese music
- Instruments: koto, sangen, jushichi-gen, biwa, shakuhachi
- Years active: 2003–2009, 2019-present
- Labels: avex trax, Domo Records
- Members: Mana - 吉永真奈 (Mana Yoshinaga); Tomoca - 長須与佳 (Tomoca Nagasu); Chie - 新井智恵 (Chie Arai)
- Website: https://rin-futatabi.amebaownd.com/

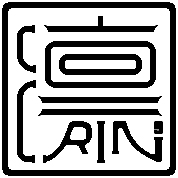
The official Rin' logo, as a whole, depicts its name in the Chinese character(Kanji) 凜, simultaneously in the bottom right corner, its name is concealed in English.

Rin' is an all-female Japanese pop group which combines traditional Japanese musical instruments and style with elements of modern pop and rock music.

== History ==
The band is a female trio of Tokyo National University of Fine Arts and Music alumni who graduated in 2003.

The band made their performing debut in December 2003, at Meguro Gajoen, and in April 2004, their first single, called Sakitama, was released by avex trax.

Chie Arai and Mana Yoshinaga play koto, sangen, and jushichi-gen, while Tomoca Nagasu plays biwa and shakuhachi. All three perform vocals.

According to the band's website, the name Rin' comes from the English word 'ring', the Japanese word Wa (和, meaning both 'ring' and 'Japanese-style'), and from the trio's hope to create a 'ring', or circle, of music.

Since their debut, the band has performed in many venues around the world, and have released four singles and several albums. A number of their songs have been used as themes for anime and movies, most notable is Fuhen used in the Samurai 7 anime.

Their chief international album, Inland Sea, was released worldwide: in Europe and the United States on April 25, 2006 and in Japan on August 30, 2006, featuring guest performances by Leigh Nash and Lisa Loeb.

According to the band's website, as of 13 February 2009, Rin' had put an end to their activities and decided to disband.

After 10 years, the group announced their reunification on their official websites on March 8, 2019, and thereafter released the single Koumyou in the same year, held a number of concerts, and released a new album HORIN in 2021. .

== Members ==
- 'Mana' Yoshinaga (吉永 真奈, Yoshinaga Mana) (born November 20, 1979) - vocals, koto, sangen, jushichi-gen
- 'Tomoca' Nagasu (長須 与佳, Nagasu Tomoka) (born December 22, 1978) - vocals, satsuma biwa, shakuhachi
- 'Chie' Arai (新井 智恵, Arai Chie) (born May 10, 19??) - vocals, koto, sangen, jushichi-gen

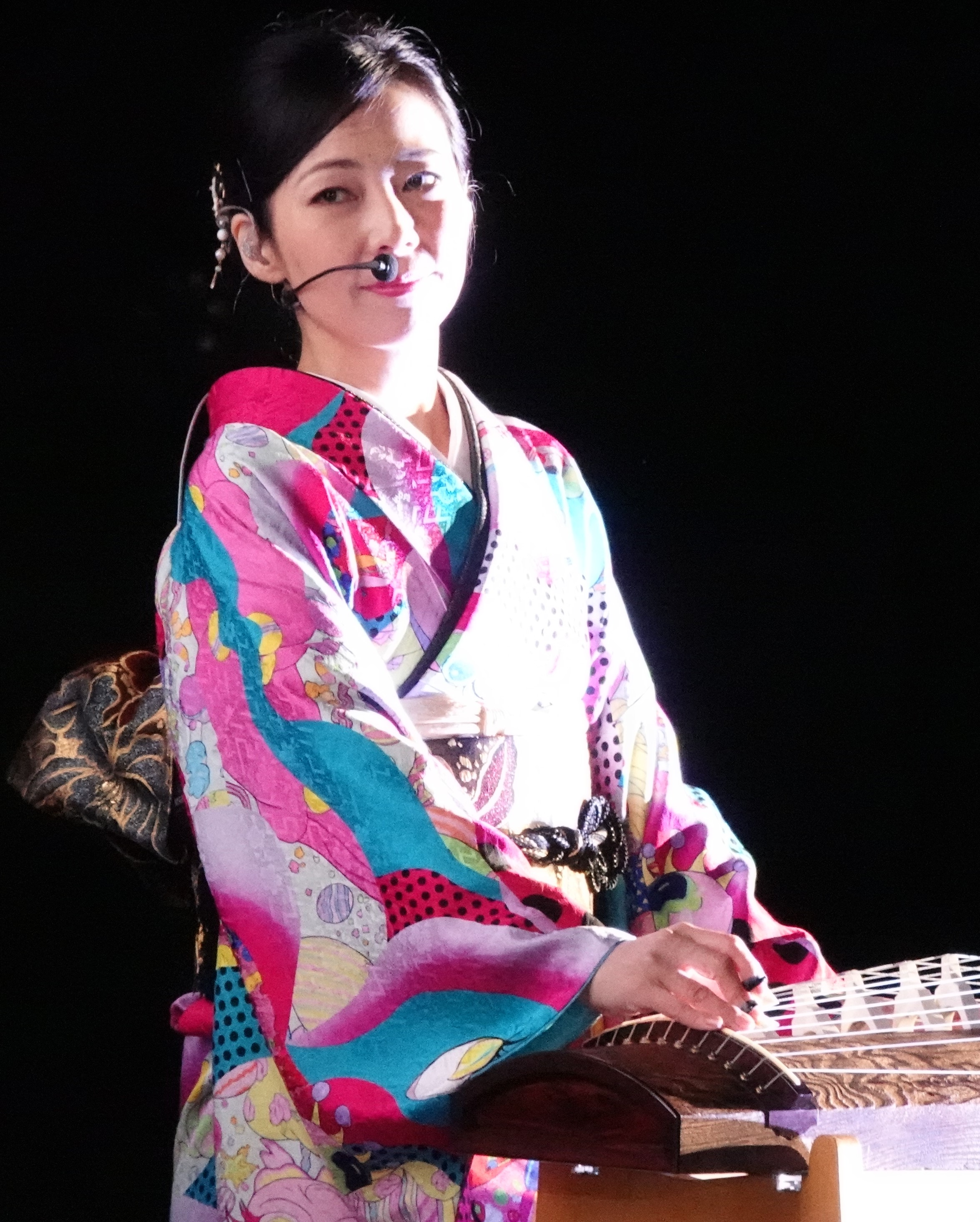
Mana Yoshinaga / 吉永真奈 (03.12.2020)

== Discography ==
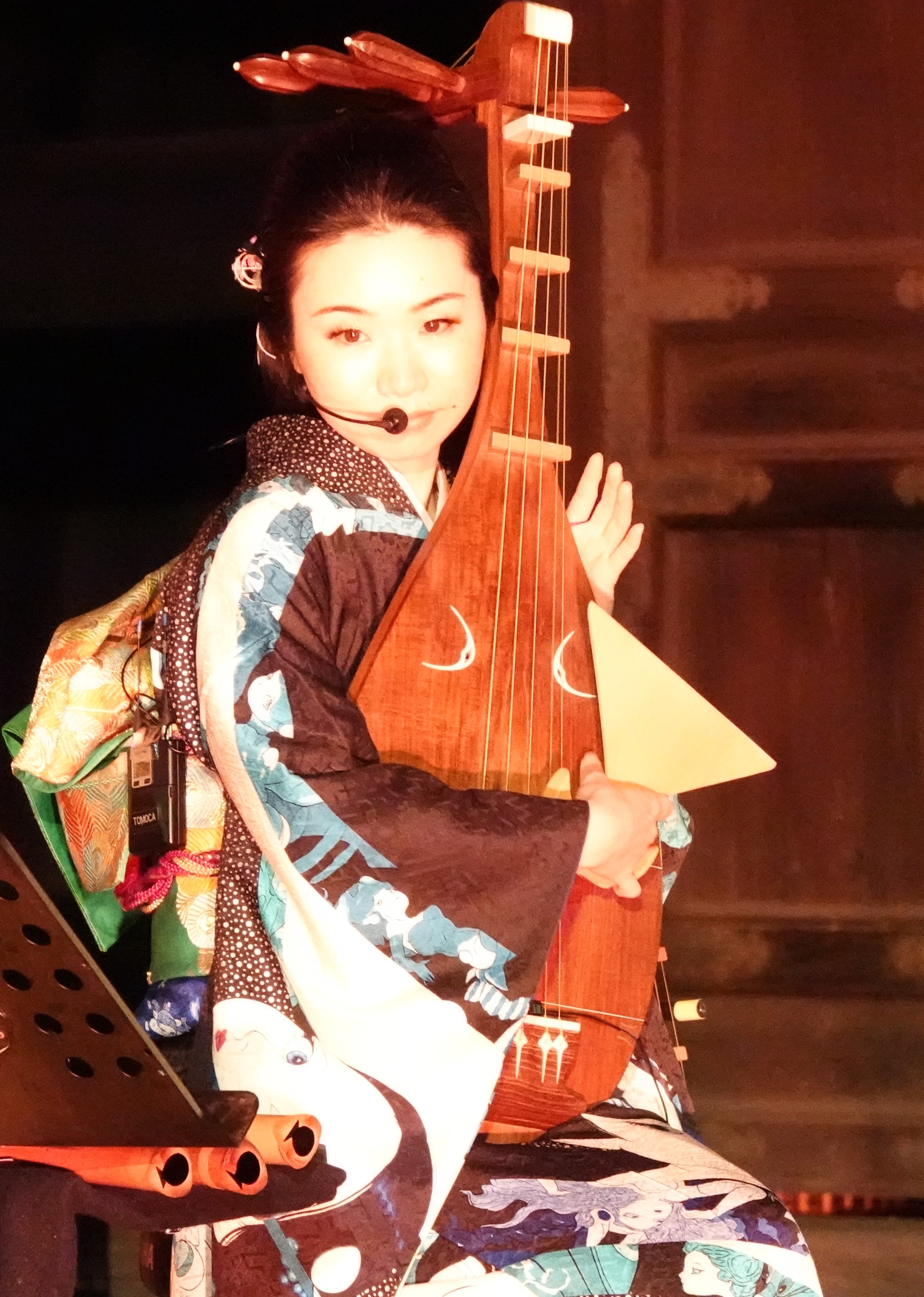
Tomoca Nagasu / 長須与佳 (03.12.2020)

=== Singles ===
1. Sakitama (Sakitama～幸魂～) (7 April 2004)
  1. Sakitama (Sakitama～幸魂～, Sakitama: Lucky Soul)
  2. Jikū (Instrumental) (時空(Instrumental))
  3. Sakitama (Instrumental) (Sakitama～幸魂～(Instrumental))
2. Yachiyo no Kaze (八千代ノ風) (30 June 2004)
  1. Yachiyo no Kaze (八千代ノ風)
  2. Release
  3. Yachiyo no Kaze (Instrumental) (八千代ノ風(Instrumental))
  4. Release(Instrumental)
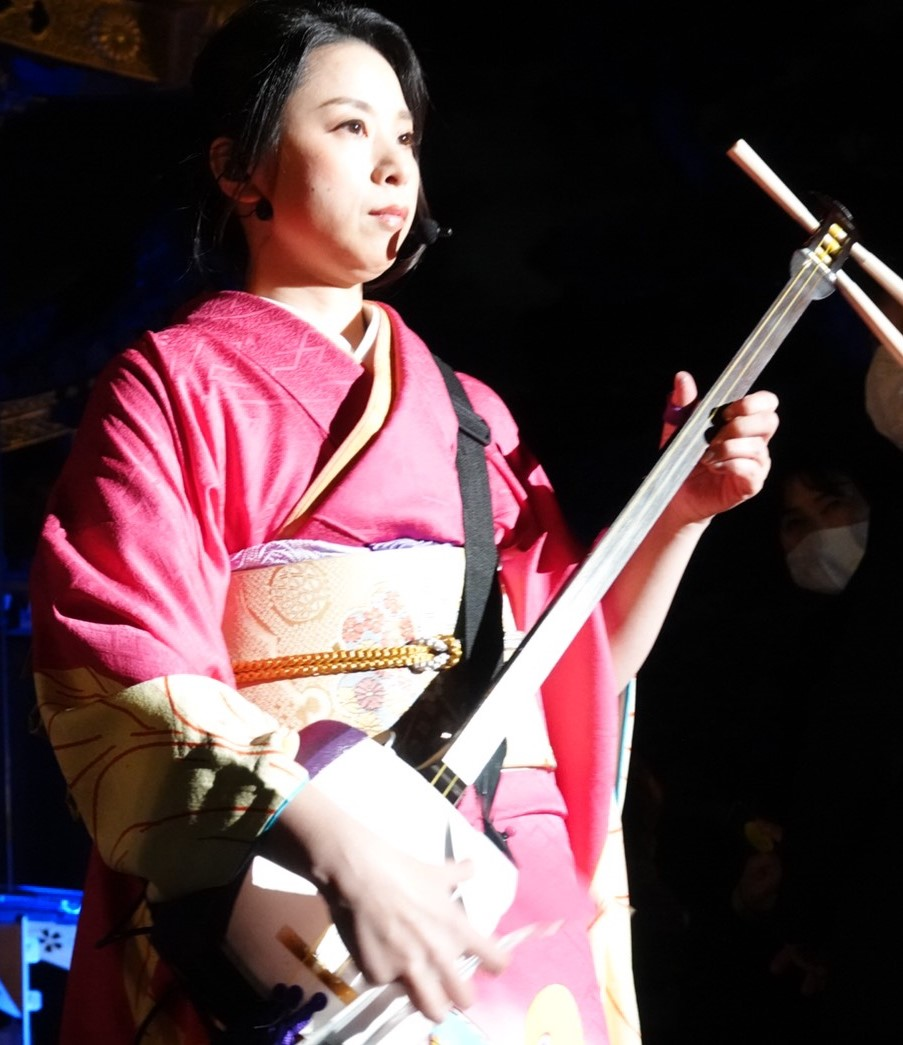
3. Chie Arai / 新井智恵 (03.12.2020)
  Sakura Sakura (サクラ サクラ) (20 April 2005)
  1. Sakura Sakura (サクラ サクラ)
  2. Sakura Sakura (instrumental with shakuhachi and shamisen) (サクラ サクラ(Instrumental with 尺八・三味線))
4. Yume hanabi (夢花火, Dream Fireworks) (31 August 2005)
  1. Yume hanabi: Rin' Three Pieces (夢花火: Rin' Three Pieces)
  2. Yume hanabi (夢花火)
  3. Flashback: Rin' Version
  4. Yume hanabi: Instrumental (夢花火: Instrumental)

=== Albums ===
1. Jikū (時空, Space-time) (12 May 2004)
  1. Jikū (時空, Space-time)
  2. Sakitama (Sakitama～幸魂～, Sakitama: Lucky Soul)
  3. Yachiyo no Kaze (八千代ノ風)
  4. Fuhen (普遍, Ubiquity) (featured as the ending theme to the anime series Samurai 7)
  5. Miyabi (雅, Elegant)
  6. weakness
  7. Dōshin (道心, Moral Sense)
  8. Smile On: English ver.
  9. Will
  10. Sai no Kami (サイの神)
  11. Eternal
2. Asuka (飛鳥) (29 September 2004)
  1. Asuka (飛鳥, Flying Bird)
  2. Bibō no Kuni (美貌の國, Land of Beauty)
  3. The Grace
  4. Kamen (仮面, Mask)
  5. Kurenai (紅, Crimson)
  6. innocence
  7. Kochō no Yume (胡蝶之夢, Dream of Butterflies)
  8. Nomado
  9. Kagami Tsuki (鏡月, Mirror Moon)
  10. Tenka (天華, Quintessence of Heaven)
  11. Hanafubuki (花吹雪, Flower Storm)
  12. Asukagawa (明日香川)
  13. Sarasōju (沙羅双樹, A Couple of Sal Trees)
  14. Hanging in there
3. Rin' Christmas Cover Songs: Seiya (～Rin' Christmas Cover Songs～聖夜) (14 November 2004)
  1. Happy Xmas (War Is Over)
  2. Last Christmas
  3. Rin' Xmas Medley: Silent Night / 赤鼻のトナカイ / I Saw Mommy Kissing Santa Claus / Jingle Bells / We Wish You a Merry Xmas / Silent Night
  4. Koukyōkyoku Daikyūban (交響曲 第九番, Symphony No.9 (Beethoven) also called "Ode to Joy")
  5. Christmas Eve (クリスマス・イブ)
  6. Merry Christmas Mr.Lawrence
  7. White Christmas
  8. In My Life (First edition-only bonus track))
4. Utage uta/Sakura Sakura (宴歌（うたげうた）/さくら さくら, Party Song /Cherry Blossom) (Live album, 30 March 2005)
5. Inland Sea (released in U.S./Europe on 25 April 2006, in Japan on 30 August 2006)
  1. New Day Rising (feat. Leigh Nash)
  2. Solemn
  3. What the Rain Said
  4. Never Knew What Love Meant (feat. Leigh Nash)
  5. Moss Garden
  6. Anti Hero (feat. Lisa Loeb)
  7. Inland Sea
  8. Sea of Tranquility (feat. Leigh Nash)
  9. Superflat(Part II)
  10. Past Imperfect
  11. AA170
  12. Niji Musubi (虹結び, Rainbow Tying) (Japan-only bonus track)
6. Inland Sea -Special edition- (Includes 2 CDs and a DVD. The first CD is the same like the normal Inland Sea CD without track 12. So here is only the track list of the second CD. The DVD includes the videos of Anti Hero, Sakura Sakura (サクラ サクラ), Inland Sea Spot and Samurai Heart)
  1. Sanzen Sekai (三千世界)
  2. Jikū (時空, Spacetime)
  3. Asuka (飛鳥, Flying Bird)
  4. Sakitama (Sakitama～幸魂～, Sakitama: Lucky Soul)
  5. Akatsuki No Sora (暁の契, Sky at Dawn)
  6. Niji Musubi (虹結び, Rainbow Tying)
  7. Bibō no Kuni (美貌の國, Land of Beauty)
  8. Dōshin (道心, Moral Sense)
  9. Tenka (天華, Quintessence of Heaven)
  10. Hanafubuki (花吹雪, Flower Storm)
  11. Utage Uta (残花, Party Song)
7. Genji Nostalgie (源氏ノスタルジー, Genji Nosutarujī) (5 December 2007)
  1. Murasaki No Yukari, futatabi (紫のゆかり、ふたたび, Belonging to the purple, once again)
  2. Genji
  3. Sennen No Niji (千年の虹, Rainbow of A Thousand Years) (feat. alan)
  4. Ranka (乱華, Chaotic Beauty)
  5. Na Mo Naki Hana (名もなき花, Nameless Flower)
  6. Asaki Yume Mishi (浅キ夢見シ, And we shall not have superficial dreams) The title comes from the poem Ihora (Ihora-uta) (jap. いろは歌; 伊呂波歌)

=== DVD ===
1. "Utage: Rin' First Live Tour 2004 Jikū" (歌宴: Rin' First Live Tour 2004 "時空") (17 November 2004)

=== Other ===
1. Rin' featuring m.c.A・T Flashback (31 August 2005; used in Kamen Rider Hibiki & The Seven Senki)
2. Crossover Japan '05 CD/DVD (28 September 2005)
3. Provided traditional instrument sounds to the backing track for the single Samurai Heart [侍 Heart] recorded by Japanese pop band AAA. Released December 2006 by Avex Trax music as part of a double A side single package called Black and White, which featured the tracks Samurai Heart and Winter Lander. (Rin' only play on 'Samurai heart' and track is credited to AAA, not as a Rin' single).
4. In 2008 Rin' collaborated with Japanese composer Conisch on the soundtrack to a Japanese TV drama series called Hana goromo yume goromo 「花衣夢衣」. This resulted in an album of this music being released through EMI Music Japan (4 June 2008). Although this work is not acknowledged on the Rin' websites (as it is released by a record label different than their usual Avex Trax), the group get equal title credits, appearing as Rin' & Conisch. The album has 34 tracks, lasts 69 minutes and mixes Rin's traditional Japanese instruments with a full western orchestra.
