= Elizabeth Falconer =

Elizabeth Falconer (born July 20, 1956) is one of the few American masters of the koto, a traditional zither from Japan. Unusually, she is licensed in two koto schools in Japan. She began playing the koto in 1979. She earned a junshihan (associate degree) from the Seiha Koto School, studying under Nagane Utayumi. This school focused on classical works. She later moved to Tokyo and studied under the esteemed Sawai Kazue and Sawai Tadao at the Sawai Koto School, and earned a Shihan (master's license) at the Sawai Koto School, which focuses on contemporary works. She is an admirer of the work of Sawai Kazue.

Falconer holds a BA in Japanese Studies from the University of Oregon, an MA in Japanese Pedagogy, and a PhD in International Education, writing her dissertation on koto teaching methods in Japan. Her works for koto are published in Japan. She has earned numerous awards for her work combining Japanese folktales with original koto music and has produced over 10 albums on her label, Koto World.
