= Reiko Obata =

American musician

Reiko Obata is a Japanese-American koto performer and composer, based in Southern California, United States.

== Background ==
Reiko Obata began studying koto in 1980 after studying flute and piano as a child. She studied koto under masters in the United States and Japan including Mde. Kayoko Wakita in Los Angeles and composer and virtuoso Shinichi Yuize in Tokyo. Obata has a music master's degree from San Diego State University and her daishihan (grand master) degree from Seiha Conservatory of Japanese Music. She plays koto, bass koto and shamisen.

== Career ==
Obata has performed with jazz saxophonist Hollis Gentry III, classical symphony musicians, and traditional Japanese artists. She has performed koto at the Temecula and Idyllwild Jazz Festivals. Her music can be heard in Byron Barth's 2007 The Art of Zen Shiatsu DVD, as well as Vivian Price's 2006 film, Transnational Tradeswomen. Obata performed koto, shamisen, and percussion in Dr. Marianne McDonald's award-winning play ...and then he met a woodcutter.

As one of the few koto performers to perform koto concertos with U.S. orchestras, Obata has been a featured soloist on multiple occasions with orchestras including with Orchestra Nova for San Diego's KPBS in 2010. She has performed koto for television, radio, film, and live theatre. Obata has been a featured performer at harp and folk festivals. She is a former World Music and Music Appreciation college instructor.

Obata has recorded multiple CDs of her own compositions and arrangements, including Serenity, Sound of Kiri, and a self-titled jazz koto CD with her band East West, founded in 2005. She was one of the first koto players to play jazz on the koto and the only one to have released a CD of jazz standards.

Obata produced the first English language koto instructional DVD You Can Play Koto, as well as produced and arranged the first all-Western notation koto books, Christmas Songs for Koto and Japanese Melodies for Koto.
