= Hikaru Sawai =

Japanese koto player and composer (born 1964)

Hikaru Sawai (沢井 比河流, Sawai Hikaru; born 1964) is a Japanese koto player and composer. He is the son of the late Kazue Sawai and late Tadao Sawai, both of whom are also renowned as koto players and composers.

== Musical career ==
In 1992, Sawai Hikaru won the 14th Ministry of Cultural Affairs Performing Arts Grand Prix Award for an original work, "Shaei," for solo koto. His concerts in 1993 and 1994 were widely acclaimed; a New Year's concert performance of "Shaei" was broadcast by satellite to all parts of the world, kindling growing interest in the koto as a modern instrument.

Sawai is also a metal guitarist, so his koto works include metal techniques, rhythm and scale. In 1985 he formed the rock band "Mephisto Pheles", for which he composed and played guitar. The band had a strong following and a lasting influence, re-forming in 2001 for a 21-city Japanese tour promoting their new album “Metal on Metal” on the VAP label.

Sawai Hikaru directs the influential Sawai Sokyoku-in (Sawai Koto Academy of Music) in Tokyo. The academy was founded in 1979 by his parents Sawai Tadao and Sawai Kazue. It is noted for its dynamic performances, innovative playing techniques, variety of sounds, and openness to new musical forms and combinations.

Some of his concerts include:

- 1995: at the City Theater in Paris;
- 1999: an 11-city tour in Japan and abroad to celebrate Sawai Koto Academy’s 20th commemoration;
- 2007: Sawai Hikaru and Sawai Kazue performed with their massed koto troupe “Sawai Koto Orchestra” in Kuala Lumpur, Malaysia.
