= Samurai 7 =

Japanese anime television series

- Cover of the first Japanese DVD volume
- Genre: Adventure, science fiction chanbara
- Created by: Akira Kurosawa
- Anime television series
- Directed by: Toshifumi Takizawa
- Produced by: Daisuke Itō; Kazuhiko Inomata
- Written by: Atsuhiro Tomioka
- Music by: Kaoru Wada; Eitetsu Hayashi
- Studio: Gonzo
- Licensed by: Crunchyroll; AUS: Madman Entertainment; SEA: Odex; UK: MVM Entertainment
- Original network: Perfect Choice, NHK BShi, NHK BS2, Animax, NHK General TV
- English network: CA: Razer (Kamikaze); SEA: Animax Asia; SG: Arts Central; US: IFC, Animania HD, Funimation Channel, Adult Swim (Toonami), Crunchyroll Channel; ZA: Animax, M-Net EDGE, VUZU, Mzansi Magic, Mzansi Wethu, 1Magic, ME, SABC 2
- Original run: June 12, 2004 – December 25, 2004
- Episodes: 26

Samurai 7 (stylized as SAMURAI 7) is a 2004 anime television series produced by Gonzo and based on the 1954 Akira Kurosawa film Seven Samurai. The seven samurai have the same names and similar characteristics to their counterparts from the original. The series was directed by Toshifumi Takizawa, and its music was composed by Kaoru Wada and Eitetsu Hayashi. There are 26 episodes.

The series premiered across Japan on the anime satellite television network, Animax, as an exclusive high definition CS-PPV broadcast, and was also later aired by the network across its other respective networks worldwide, including Southeast Asia, South Asia, Latin America and other regions. Funimation acquired the dubbing rights for the North America release. It previously aired in America through the Independent Film Channel (using Funimation's dub) in April 2006 and in high definition on the Voom's Animania HD channel (also using Funimation's dub). It has also been broadcast across Canada by specialty channel Razer and across Hong Kong by TVB Jade. The Funimation Channel aired the series on September 6, 2010. It began airing on Adult Swim's revived Toonami block on August 19, 2012 and ended its run on February 10, 2013.

== Plot ==
Samurai 7 tells the story of a village named Kanna. Set in a futuristic world that has just witnessed the end of a massive war, scores of villages are terrorized by Nobuseri bandits. But the Nobuseri are no normal bandits. They were once samurai, who during the war integrated their living cells with machines to become dangerous weapons now appearing more machine than man. Absolute power corrupts, and their reign of terror is increasing its hold on the countryside.

The elder of Kanna Village has decided that to protect the village they must hire samurai to fight against the bandits. However, the village has no money and thus must find samurai willing to protect the village for a payment of rice. Three members of the village leave to attempt to recruit samurai. They travel to the city and search for samurai willing to work, and after finding several samurai and having a few encounters with the local government, they return to Kanna village to prepare defenses against the bandits.

The samurai train the villagers in the use of bows, building walls, and construct a giant ballista to defend the village against the bandits. After successfully defeating the bandits, the samurai then launch an attack upon the capital to defeat a power-hungry ruler who has recently risen to power as Emperor. After heavy casualties for the samurai, and the near-destruction of Kanna village, the capital is finally defeated.

== Characters ==
The seven recruited samurai.

=== Samurai ===
Shimada Kanbei (島田 カンベエ)
Voiced by: Masaki Terasoma (Japanese); R Bruce Elliott (English)

Kanbei is a wise samurai who has survived many battles, though he feels no joy from them. Many of his friends have died in those battles, and he was on the losing side of many of them. He constantly lives in the shadow of his painful and violent past, rejecting Kirara after stating that his heart is dried up. He leads the group during their battles and usually plans strategy. In the end, after understanding Katsushiro has become a successful samurai, he passes his sword onto him as he leaves Kanna village ahead of him and Shichirouji. He is the first samurai.

Okamoto Katsushiro (岡本 カツシロウ)
Voiced by: Romi Park (Japanese); Sean Michael Teague (English)

Katsushiro is a young and inexperienced samurai who wishes to be Kanbei's student, calling him sensei almost from their first meeting. He idolizes the principles of bushido. He promises to protect Kirara no matter what, and seems to be attracted to her. He grows stronger and more skillful throughout the series, eventually becoming a worthy student of Kanbei; and he also comes to terms with killing enemies, after reacting in shock the first time. He becomes strong enough to deflect the capital's main cannon, and defeated numerous bandits in his own right. He gains emotional strength as well, and understands what his true reason for becoming a samurai is. After turning down Kirara in the end, he explains to her that he intends to continue his life on the battlefield. After hearing this, he receives Kanbei's sword from him in recognition as his student. Unlike in the original movie, he shows more focus on becoming a samurai and improving his skills greatly in the anime (where in the original he was preoccupied with a love affair). He is the fifth samurai.

Katayama Gorobei (片山 ゴロベエ)
Voiced by: Tetsu Inada (Japanese); Bob Carter (English)

Gorobei is a skilled samurai who has made his living since the wars' end by entertaining people on the city streets. He is also a veteran of the Great War, so he knows Kanbei by reputation. He is very skilled at dodging blows and can pluck arrows and darts from the air. This ability was presumably based on the fact that in the original movie, Gorobei was able to sense (from a few feet outside the door) Katsushiro's waiting to hit him inside the hut. He often makes light of rather serious or dangerous situations. He is also quite smart, in his own unique way. He also appears to have a paraphilia with inflicted injury as it reminds him of battle. He is the second samurai, he was also the first samurai to die in the anime, and guided Katsushiro to go back to Kanna Village in spirit form.

Shichiroji (シチロージ)
Voiced by: Tohru Kusano (Japanese); Duncan Brannan (English)

Shichiroji initially fought side by side in the Great War with Kanbei, and is often referred to as "Kanbei's old wife" ("mate" in the English dub). He temporarily leaves behind his successful post-war business at the Firefly Inn, and with it, his beautiful girlfriend/fiance, to join Kanbei in battle once again. He has a prosthetic left hand which has a grappling hook capability with his index finger. In combat he uses a type of spear; the only samurai not using a sword. This is probably a reference to his using a spear mainly during the final battle in the original movie (though normally he carried a sword). His girlfriend, Yukino, has nicknamed him Momotarō, from the traditional Japanese tale, because she found him, badly injured after a battle, floating down a river inside a capsule reminiscent of a peach. He is the fourth samurai.

Kikuchiyo (キクチヨ)
Voiced by: Kong Kuwata (Japanese); Christopher Sabat (English)

Kikuchiyo is a cyborg with a mechanized exoskeleton. He was originally a peasant until becoming a samurai in order to help others. He is often looked upon as a clown or a bother, as he gets angry easily and often causes trouble with his loud noise and clumsy ways. He is accepted as the seventh samurai after revealing he was also a farmer, like the peasants of Kanna. He carries the largest of the swords, which also acts as a chainsaw. He is fiercely loyal to Kanbei, and, when given recognition, he returns favors fourfold. He is well-liked by the villagers, especially by little Komachi, who asks him to become her husband when she grows up, a request that he accepts in return for her keeping his fake family tree. He died from an explosion when stopping the crashing capital from destroying Kanna village using one of the Bandit's giant swords. He is the seventh and final samurai.

Hayashida Heihachi (林田 ヘイハチ)
Voiced by: Junji Inukai (Japanese); Greg Ayres (English)

Heihachi is a genial samurai who wishes to avoid fighting as much as possible and prefers to eat rice instead. During the Great War, he took a position as a combat engineer, which kept him off the front lines but also used his mechanical skills. He is discovered chopping wood in exchange for food or devices that interest him. He is most helpful within the group as their mechanic, and orchestrates the construction of medieval-type weapons. However, he harbors a deep hatred for traitors as he was one himself, which resulted in his whole unit being killed. Within the series, he talks about the old tradition of the "seven rice kami" inside every grain of rice: he is pinned by a Bandit's Giant sword while detonating the explosive that would detach the engines from the Capital Airship, and before falling to his death, he shouts out to Katsushiro: "I'll be in the rice" or "Find me in the rice". He is the third samurai.

Kyuzo (キュウゾウ)
Voiced by: Shinichiro Miki (Japanese); Sonny Strait (English)

Kyuzo is originally a nearly silent, mysterious bodyguard for Ayamaro. In that role, he fights with Kanbei, and he later joins the group with the stated intent of saving Kanbei's life so that he can later fight Kanbei to the death. Kyuzo is an incredibly skilled fighter, wielding double blades that fit into one sheath on his back. He is accidentally killed by Katsushiro when he used a gun to protect Kanbei; because Katsushiro's sword was broken. Instead of showing anger to Katsushiro or regret of his own life, he instead expresses his anticipation of fighting Kanbei in the afterlife. He is the sixth samurai.

=== Kanna Village ===
Kirara Mikumari (キララ)
Voiced by: Fumiko Orikasa (Japanese); Colleen Clinkenbeard (English)

Kirara is a Mikumari (water maiden, a village priestess) of Kanna village. She decides to go find the samurai to be brought back to her village, while admitting that she also wanted to see the outside world. She possesses a dowsing crystal on a necklace which allows her to detect the flow of groundwater and to read other's hearts. She rejects Katsushiro's love, and later is shown to have fallen for Kanbei instead, who rejected her for his own reasons.

Komachi Mikumari (コマチ)
Voiced by: Chiwa Saito (Japanese); Luci Christian (English)

Komachi is Kirara's little sister, who follows along with her and Rikichi to see the city as well as help locate the samurai. She likes the boisterous Kikuchiyo and asks him to marry her when she grows up. After the death of Kikuchiyo, Komachi is seen with her sister's dowsing necklace hinting that she inherited her position as the Mikumari of her village.

Rikichi (リキチ)
Voiced by: Tadahisa Saizen (Japanese); J. Michael Tatum (English)

Rikichi is a peasant of Kanna, who travels with Kirara to locate the samurai. He can be often rash because of his hatred for the bandits. He blames himself for the loss of his wife, Sanae, who has given herself up to the bandits to save the village. Kanbei promises to rescue Sanae, and Rikichi is eventually reunited with her.

Gisaku (ギサク)
Voiced by: Ikuo Nishikawa (Japanese); Andrew Haskett (English)

The village patriarch who hired samurai to battle bandits.

Setsu (セツ)
Voiced by: Atsuko Mine (Japanese); Juli Erickson (English)

The matriarch of Kanna village and former water priestess. She is also Kirara and Komachi's Grandmother.

Okara (オカラ)
Voiced by: Megumi Tano (Japanese); Zarah Little (English)

Komachi's best friend in Kanna village, Okara is always receiving letters from her about everything that goes on with the samurai. A strong lover of gossip and secrets, she always a mischievous laugh whenever she sees a secret or overhears some juicy gossip. Even though Okara is around Komachi's age, she speaks and acts like a full grown woman with wisdom and perception of truth far beyond her years. Okara always has a baby on her back, though it's never explained whose baby it is, what its name is, if it's a boy or a girl, or even why it's with her.

Manzō (万造)
Voiced by: Naoki Makishima (Japanese); Mark Stoddard (English)

A farmer in Kanna Village. A somewhat ugly man with a pointed head and buck-teeth, he is always complaining about anything and everything. He becomes the unofficial spokesman for the villagers who don't want the samurai's help and wish to maintain the status quo. Just before the battle with the bandits, Manzo attempts to sell out the samurai to a bandit scout, after which Katsushiro is forced to kill the scout. When Manzō (万造) is brought before the villagers to answer for his betrayal, he is defended by an unlikely advocate, Kikuchiyo. Kikuchiyo lectures everyone that it was the tragic cycle of what the Bandits and Samurai do to villagers that make them turncoats and cowards, and that Manzo shouldn't be faulted for acting in desperation. Kanbei convinces Manzo that his home and village are not truly his, but possessions of the bandits, and that he should fight for them and for his daughter. Though Manzō (万造) eventually becomes loyal to the samurai's cause, he never fully stops complaining about every little thing.

Shino (シノ)
Voiced by: Yu Kobayashi (Japanese); Monica Rial (English)

Manzo's daughter. It was told that Shino was very beautiful until her father cut off all her hair and covered her with dirt to disguise her from being taken by the bandits. She's always arguing with her father about his wanting to betray the samurai. She appears to be a close friend of Kirara.

Mosuke (モスケ)
Voiced by: Takehiro Murozono (Japanese); Kyle Hebert (English)

A farmer of Kanna village. A short pudgy man who's always complaining about things along with Manzo.

Yohei (ヨヘイ)
Voiced by: Kenichi Mochizuki (Japanese); Grant James (English)
Gosaku (ゴサク)
Voiced by: Youhei Oobayashi (Japanese); Christopher Bevins (English)

=== Antagonists ===
Ukyo (ウキョウ)
Voiced by: Takehito Koyasu (Japanese); Anthony Bowling (English)

Ukyo is the adopted heir to Ayamaro. His shielded and pampered lifestyle leaves him with a self-centered yet playful attitude on life, which is really a cover for a rather calculating, manipulative and cruel personality. He is later revealed to be the 49th clone of the Emperor and after surviving a three-day ordeal of constant questioning, Ukyo is proclaimed heir to the throne. He then murders the Emperor to succeed him and launches a plan to pit the villagers, samurai and bandits against one another to consolidate his control.

Tessai (テッサイ)
Voiced by: Michihiro Ikemizu (Japanese); Robert McCollum (English)

Tessai is a samurai employed by Ukyo as a body guard. Throughout most of the series, he plays the role of the frustrated sycophant to Ukyo, enduring near constant verbal abuse. However, he is eventually revealed to be a competent warrior, whose martial skills may even be greater than the heroes. His subservience to Ukyo comes from a sense of personal honor in loyalty to his retainer, however undeserving that retainer might be.

Tessai's dress is a derivative of the traditional dress of the Dutch fishermen town of Volendam, including his pipe.

Ayamaro (アヤマロ)
Voiced by: Seiji Sasaki (Japanese); Barry Yandell (English)

Ayamaro is the Magistrate to Kogakyo and adopted father of Ukyo. He raised Ukyo and taught him in the ways of commerce. But, when his samurai hunt for the murderer of the Imperial Envoy turn up unsuccessful, he is stripped of his title which is given to Ukyo. Ayamaro was seen in the last episode, living among the Shikimoribito.

Hyogo (ヒョーゴ)
Voiced by: Takeshi Kusao (Japanese); Jerry Jewell (English)

Hyogo is one of Ayamaro's bodyguards. He is identifiable by an androgynous appearance, and deports a cutthroat personality; he is always seen trying to outshine Kyuzo, as suggested in Episode 5 when he challenges Kanbei after Kyuzo is defeated by the ronin. He is later killed by Kyuzo, who cuts him down after he fires a shot from his newly-acquired rifle at Katsushiro.

Amanushi (アマヌシ)/Lord/Emperor
Voiced by: Takehito Koyasu (Japanese); Anthony Bowling (English)

He's the emperor, whose body was damaged during the great war. Therefore he bought out the samurai in an act of revenge. He also created several clones in an attempt to make a successor, including Ukyo. The reason behind the harem of women he keeps is to impregnate them with his seed in order to create more clones; this is seen with Sanae being pregnant with another clone and Mizuki revealing that they were being used as "farms" to hold the clones of Amanushi.

Genzo (ゲンゾウ)
Voiced by: Ryuzaburo Otomo (Japanese); Sean Schemmel (English)

Leader of the intelligence operation during the initial Kanna Village campaign, receiving information from Manzo. Following his meeting with Manzo being discovered by Katsushiro, he was killed by Katsushiro while inside a Yakan.

==== Mechanical Samurai ====
During the great war, there are samurai that had converted their bodies into large fighting machines. When the war was ended by merchants, many became Nobuseri (野伏せり), or bandits. Under the emperor's employment, the bandit units rob farming villages of their rice, and occasionally women and children for the capital. During Capital's journey to Kanna Village, Ukyo orders the court physician to remove the bandits' souls, so they will be nothing more than mindless machines, accepting orders only from the emperor.

Yakan (鋼筒(ヤカン))/Teakettle

A troop-transporting unit. During the battle against Capital, one such unit was reused by Heihachi to infiltrate Capital. It is the only mechanical samurai in the series that is operated by pilot.

Raiden (雷電(ライデン))
Benigumo (紅蜘蛛(ベニグモ))
Tobito (跳兎跳(トビト))

It is usually in flying saucer form, but it can split into two rabbit-eared units.

Mimizuku (梟(ミミズク))

A humanoid unit dressed in black suit, resembling a ninja.

Syusai (シュウサイ)
Voiced by: Takashi Nagasako (Japanese); Brett Weaver (English)

Head of the bandit army leading the campaign against Kanna Village.

Sobei (ソウベエ)
Voiced by: Kazuhiko Kishino (Japanese); Michael Sinterniklaas (English)

Syusai's sub-commander.

Kobayakawa Tamono (コバヤカワ タノモ)
Voiced by: Naoki Makishima (Japanese); Scott McNeil (English)

A leader of bandits. It receives orders from incumbent emperor to raid villages. After Ukyo revealed his plan to have samurai hired by Ukyo to destroying the bandits, it was destroyed by Capital's main cannon blast.

=== Other characters ===
Masamune
Voiced by: Tomomichi Nishimura (Japanese); Brice Armstrong (English)
Masamune is Kikuchiyo's mechanic and veteran of the Great War. As the series progresses, he befriends Kanbei and the other samurai while they stayed in Kogakyo. He was the one who helped them escape Kogakyo in episode 6 of the show (Although he was tied up by Kambei and "roughened up" by Kikuchiyo as a ploy to trick the attendants into believing that Masamune was taken hostage rather than willingly aiding the samurai).
Yukino (ユキノ)
Voiced by: Rieko Takahashi (Japanese); Gwendolyn Lau (English)

Yukino is Shichiroji's lover and the woman who saved his life when Shichiroji's escape pod washed ashore on the river underneath the Firefly House. Indebted to Yukino, Shichiroji helps her run the Firefly House and claims that he had abandoned the samurai life. However, it is one of Yukino's fears that the old samurai hasn't quite forgotten fighting. When Shichiroji joins Kanbei and the others on their journey to Kanna Village, Yukino waits for him, expecting him to return with "a mountain of treasure" as in the old tale of "Peach Boy" with which they tease Shichiroji with. As the series progresses, Yukino seems to be very sisterly towards Kirara and is aware of Kirara's hidden love for Kanbei.

Honoka (ホノカ)
Voiced by: Kumiko Watanabe (Japanese); Carrie Savage (English)

Honoka is a village girl who was traded to the Shikimoribito by the Nobuseri after they destroyed her village. In truth, she is a spy for the Nobuseri, who desire to control the Shikimoribito's power cells. If she is not compliant with the Nobuseri's wishes, they claim they will kill her little sister, Mizuki. However, when discovered, rather than be killed as Heihachi wanted, Kanbei spares her and promises to restore Mizuki to her.

Sanae (サナエ)
Voiced by: Yuu Asakawa (Japanese); Clarine Harp (English)

Rikichi's wife. She gave herself willingly to the bandits to save Kanna village. Kirara discovers from the bandits that Sanae and other "choice" girls that they abduct are sent to the capital. Later on she becomes pregnant with Amanushi's child (clone) and refuses to leave with Kanbei proclaiming that she is in love with the Emperor. Sanae believes the Emperor is misunderstood while Honoka and the other women believe she's been brainwashed. She is later informed about the loss of the baby, which devastates her, as she believes she killed the baby which was caused by the stress and grief over the Emperor's death. She begins to sob and apologize to the Emperor and later says that "she will pray for the souls of the Emperor and their [our] baby for the rest of her [my] life." Kanbei stated that the look in Sanae's eyes were "sincere love for the Emperor." After she's rescued, Sanae refuses to see Rikichi either out of shame or the fact that she still loves the Emperor. In the very last episode she is seen taking over her husband's spot in the rice fields. It is possible she might have suffered from Stockholm syndrome.

Mizuki (ミヅキ)
Voiced by: Chiaki Osawa (Japanese); Laura Bailey (English)

Honoka's little sister who is revealed to be Sanae's attendant in the Capital, rather than the Nobuseri's hostage.

Koharu
Voiced by: Mio Morisawa (Japanese); Caitlin Glass (English)
Chiaki
Voiced by: Tadahori Moriya (Japanese); Lucy Small (English)

== Theme songs ==
- Opening: "Unlimited" by Nanase Aikawa
- Closing: "Fuhen" (Ubiquity) by Rin'
- Opening NHK TV Version: "Justice" by Coming Century (V6)
- Closing NHK TV Version: "Niji Musubi" (Tying Rainbow) by Rin'
