= Haru no Umi =

Music composition by Michio Miyagi

Song
- English title: The Sea in Spring
- Written: 1929
- Composer: Michio Miyagi

External audio
- Haru no Umi. Performed by Michio Miyagi (Koto) and Seifu Yoshida (Shakuhachi) in 1930
- http://dl.ndl.go.jp/info:ndljp/pid/1319027

Haru no Umi (春の海, "The Sea in Spring") is a Shin Nihon Ongaku ('New Japanese Music') piece for koto and shakuhachi composed in 1929 by Michio Miyagi. It is Miyagi's best known piece and one of the most famous for the koto and shakuhachi instruments. The piece is well-known in Japan as it is commonly played as background music during the New Year season in shopping streets and other facilities.

Miyagi composed the music from his childhood image of the sea of Tomonoura that he saw before he lost his eyesight.

At one stage the accoms some resemblance to a part of Septet in E♭ major by Saint-Saëns (1881), but it is not known if Saint-Saëns influenced Miyagi.

== See also ==
- Tomonoura
- Seto Inland Sea
