= List of programs broadcast by MTV2 (Canada) =

This is a list of television programs formerly and currently broadcast by the Canadian television channel MTV2 (Canada) and its former incarnations as Razer and MTV Canada.

== Programming ==
This is a list of programs featured on MTV2.

=== Current ===
==== A–E ====
- 1 Girl 5 Gays
- California Dreams
- Campus PD
- Cash Cab
- Comedy Now!
- The Dessert
- Disaster Date
- The Ex and the Why?
- Ex on the Beach

==== F–O ====
- Friendzone
- Geordie Shore
- Girl, Get Your Mind Right
- Good Stuff
- Hollywood Heights
- The Hook Up
- I Have Nothing
- MTV Creeps
- MTV Cribs

==== P–T ====
- Panic Button
- Sleeping with the Family
- True Life

==== U-Z ====
- The Valleys

=== As Razer ===
==== 0-9 ====
- 969 – formerly called MTV Select
- 4REAL

==== A–E ====
- Alternate Routes
- America's Dumbest Criminals
- America's Next Top Model
- The Andy Dick Show
- The Andy Milonakis Show
- The Ashlee Simpson Show
- Basilisk
- Battle for Ozzfest
- Beavis and Butt-Head
- Becoming
- Beyond the Break
- Boiling Points
- Born to Be
- Breaker High
- Buffy the Vampire Slayer
- Call to Greatness
- Canada's Next Top Model
- Car Cruzin
- Celebrity Deathmatch
- Clone High
- Clueless
- Corner Gas
- Cops, Cars & Superstars
- Cowboy Bebop
- Crank Yankers
- Daria
- Dawson's Creek
- Degrassi Junior High
- Degrassi: The Next Generation
- Diary
- Dismissed
- Doggy Fizzle Televizzle
- Drop the Beat
- Drop In
- Duckman
- Electric Playground
- Extreme 16mm
- Eye on Extreme

==== F–J ====
- Fandemonium
- Fist of Zen
- FNMTV
- Fraternity Life
- Freshman on Campus
- Fromage
- Fur TV
- Fusion 2001
- Fusion TV
- Geek to Freak
- Girls Behaving Badly
- Greg the Bunny
- Happy Tree Friends
- Hardcore Candy
- Headbangers Ball
- High School Project USA
- The Hilarious House of Frightenstein
- Homewrecker
- Human Giant
- I Bet You Will
- Instant Star
- Jack Osbourne: Adrenaline Junkie
- Jack Osbourne: No Fear

==== K–O ====
- The Kids in the Hall
- Kontrol
- Laguna Beach: The Real Orange County
- Made
- Madison
- Making the Video
- Malcolm in the Middle
- Master of Champions
- Meet the Barkers
- MTV e2
- MTV2 Game Trailers
- MTV Live
- MTV Screen
- MTV Unplugged
- MTV2 Videos
- MTV Wannabe
- Much 911
- MuchAdrenaline
- Music Is My Life
- My Super Sweet 16
- Newlyweds: Nick and Jessica
- Odd Job Jack
- The Osbournes

==== P–T ====
- Parental Control
- Pee-wee's Playhouse
- Pepsi Breakout
- Pimp My Ride
- Punk'd
- Pushing the Limit
- The Real World
- Reviews on the Run
- Ride Guide
- Ride with Funkmaster Flex
- Road Rules
- Rob Dyrdek's Fantasy Factory
- Room 401
- Room Raiders
- Roswell
- Sabrina the Teenage Witch
- Samurai 7
- Samurai Champloo
- Saved by the Bell
- Scare Tactics
- Scarred
- The Score
- Screwed Over
- The Second Half
- Señor Moby's House of Music
- Sic 'Em Saturdays Bites
- Shin Chan
- Silent Library
- Sorority Life
- Spy Groove
- Straight Up
- Student Bodies
- Subterranean
- Sucker Free
- Taildaters
- The Tom Green Show
- Total Request Live
- Trinity Blood
- Trippin'
- True Life

==== U–Z ====
- Ultrasound
- Under Attack
- Vans Triple Crown
- Versus
- Viva La Bam
- The Wade Robson Project
- Wanna Come In?
- Whacked Out Sports
- Whistler
- Who's Got Game
- Wild 'n Out
- Wildboyz
- Wonder Showzen
- World Famous for Dicking Around
- World of Stupid
- World's Most Amazing Videos
- Wrestling Society X
- The Wrong Coast
- Yo Momma
- Yo! MTV Raps

== Kamikaze ==
Kamikaze was the branding and programming block for anime programming on Razer. It was launched July 2006 and discontinued after the channel's rebrand as MTV2. Similar Canadian programming blocks include YTV's Bionix and G4's Anime Current.

=== Shows ===
- Air Master (unaired)
- Basilisk
- Cowboy Bebop
- Neon Genesis Evangelion
- Power Rangers Mystic Force
- Samurai 7
- Samurai Champloo
- Slam Dunk (unaired)
- Shin Chan
- The Super Milk Chan Show
- Transformers: Animated
- Trinity Blood
- Wolf's Rain
- Yu-Gi-Oh! GX
