= Ayuo Takahashi =

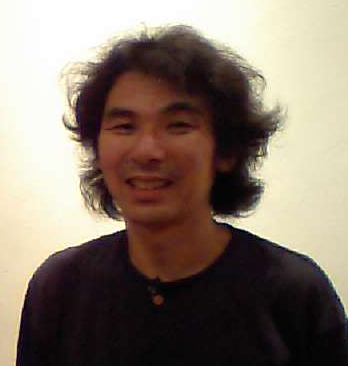

Background information
- Born: October 19, 1960 (age 65); Tokyo
- Occupations: composer, lyricist, singer, instrumentalist
- Instruments: Guitar bouzouki Irish harp Chinese zheng Japanese koto
- Website: www.ayuo.net

Ayuo Takahashi (born October 19, 1960) is a Japanese-born American composer, poet, lyricist, singer, and performer of plucked string instruments including guitar, bouzouki, Irish harp, Chinese zheng, Japanese koto, and medieval European psaltery. He is adept at adapting the ancient music of Japan, China, Persia, Greece, and medieval Europe to create a new and original music without abandoning their strict forms while simultaneously making them relevant to contemporary music styles. He has composed for classical ensembles including string quartets, piano, various chamber ensembles, and orchestra, as well as composed, produced and performed with rock, jazz and musicians of various traditional music from around the world. He has also composed many music theater pieces, some of which has been released on CD in the United States and Japan.

== Biography ==
Much of the biography here is a summary from Ayuo's autobiography first published in Japanese on his homepage (ayuo.net) and later expanded in his autobiographical book, "Outside Society" published by Getsuyosha in Japan. This book will be published in English in 2025. Most profiles of Ayuo as seen on websites such as All Music and Tzadik are based on these writings by Ayuo.

Ayuo Takahashi was born in Tokyo and spent his early childhood traveling in Germany, Sweden, and France with his parents. His father, Yuji Takahashi, is a composer of contemporary classical music and a pianist known for premiering works by Iannis Xenakis and John Cage. Ayuo and his parents settled in New York City in 1966. Ayuo grew up listening to both the new avant-garde experimental and contemporary music and the psychedelic rock music of the 1960s. He often went to museums, art galleries, and cinemas to see exhibitions of contemporary art and the new cinema. At the same time, he also saw Japanese traditional Noh plays and heard ancient and medieval music from Japan and Europe. All these were to become important influences in Ayuo's music and music-theater pieces. Ayuo's parents divorced in 1969, and Ayuo's mother married an American of Iranian descent, Mansour Malekpour, who came from a family that performed traditional Persian music. This gave Ayuo the opportunity to hear Persian traditional music, which was also to have a lasting influence on his music. Mansour's grandfather, Ali Khan, was recognized as one of the greatest singers of Persian traditional music in the early 20th century, and his voice was regarded as exceptionally unique. He used to sing for the Crown Prince of the Qajar dynasty. With Persian instrumentalists on the ground surrounding the tree, the Crown Prince created a golden cage that hung from a tree, and Ali Khan was singing from inside because he was rumored to be able to sing like a nightingale. Ayuo also grew up listening to American psychedelic rock and British progressive rock while living with his stepfather, Mansoor Malekpour, in New York in the 1960s. He attended PS 41 and the Little Red School House in Greenwich Village, NYC. He later wrote in his autobiography Outside Society and on his essays and website that the time spent with his stepfather was the happiest and most important influence on his music and musical theater work.

From the time he was in elementary school, he met artists Tadanori Yokoo and Andy Warhol, novelist Yukio Mishima, film director Hiroshi Teshigawara, and musician Yoko Ono. Beginning with 1960s psychedelic culture and influenced by Peter Gabriel, Joni Mitchell, Lou Reed, John Cale, and medieval minstrel music, he envisioned a synthesis of music, literature, and philosophy. In 1975, Ayuo's mother and step-father separated, while Ayuo was visiting his father in Japan, forcing him to live there. His first studio recording was in 1976 with his father, Yuji Takahashi, Ryuichi Sakamoto, and Masahiko Togashi on the CD "Twilight" released on Columbia Records in Japan.

Adjusting to life in Japan as a teenager was difficult, and Ayuo would later make that the main theme on his CD "What We Look Like In The Picture" released in 2006 from Zipangu in Japan. Ayuo spent his high school years writing poetry and appearing in poetry reading competitions.

Ayuo joined Keiji Haino's group "Fushitsusha" in 1979, and performed improvisation with many musicians in what was the final period of the "free music scene" in Japan of the 1970s.

Ayuo studied the traditional plucked string instrument, Biwa, with Kinshi Tsuruta. He studied contemporary music composition with Minao Shibata and Joji Yuasa.

His first solo record,"Carmina", was recorded in 1983 and released in 1984 from Epic-Sony. Since then, he has released over a dozen solo albums, collaborating with a diverse group of individuals, including Peter Hammill, Ryuichi Sakamoto, Danny Thompson, Maddy Prior, Takehisa Kosugi, Carlos Alomar, John Zorn, Bill Laswell, Dave Mattacks, Yohji Yamamoto, Jadranka Stojaković, Hiromi Ōta, Yoko Ueno, Clive Deamer, Mikigami Koichi, Wataru Ohkuma, Aki Takahashi, Mie Miki, Kazue Sawai and many Japanese traditional musicians. Three CDs of his music have been released in the United States from the TZADIK label in the 21st century.

Ayuo has composed music for films, ballet, contemporary dance, and theater. Border Line, directed by the Japanese film director Lee Sang-il in 2002, features music mostly performed alone by Ayuo.

His first book, "Outside Society," was released in 2018 and the CD "Outside Society" was released in 2018.

In 2020, the compilation album Kankyō Ongaku, which includes Ayuo's composition "Nagareru," was nominated for a Grammy Award.

In recent years, Ayuo's work has increasingly included music theater and chamber music mixed with dance and theatrical elements.

Recent works have been published at ayuo.bandcamp.com.

== Music ==
Ayuo has made unique arrangements of compositions by Erik Satie, Claude Debussy, Richard Wagner, Maurice Ravel, Toru Takemitsu and other classical composers.

Ayuo's music "Eurasian Tango", was choreographed by Martin Lawrance of the Richard Alston Dance Company in England.

== Lyrics ==
Ayuo's lyrics are often about difficulties in human relationships, especially between different cultures and between men and women. His lyrics often include scientific, literary, or historical references. He often uses texts by philosophers from Japan, the Middle East, and Europe, such as Dogen, Rumi, Kazantzakis, and others. Two of his music-theater compositions are based on a medieval Japanese Noh play by Zeami. Another music-theater composition is based on the story "Blue Eyes, Black Hair" by Marguerite Duras. There are also compositions based on mythic themes, such as the stories of Pele and Hi'iaka from Hawaii and the story of the Sun god from ancient India. Ayuo often writes on the liner notes of his CDs that he was influenced by the scholars of world myths and comparative religion, Joseph Campbell and Carl Jung.

== Discography ==
=== Albums released in Japan ===
- Carmina (1984)
- Silent Film (1985)
- Shizukani Okitegoran (1985)
- Memory Theatre (1985)
- Nova Carmina (1986)
- Blue Eyes, Black Hair (1995)
- Heavenly Garden Orchestra (1995)
- Songs from a Eurasian Journey (1997)
- Earth Guitar (2000)
- Stoned (2002)
- E No Naka No Sugata (What We Look Like In The Picture) (2006)
- dna (2009)
- Outside Society (2019)
- ayuo.bandcamp.com (2024)

=== Albums released in the US ===
- Izutsu (2000)
- Red Moon (2004)
- AOI (2005)

=== Albums released in South Korea ===
- Songs from a Eurasian Journey (1998)

=== Albums produced by Ayuo ===
- Kazue Sawai/ Me to Me (Eye to Eye)(1988)

=== Albums released on ayuo.bandcamp.com ===
Since 2020, there have been over 23 releases on the website ayuo.bandcamp.com. The list is growing each year.
