= Kazue Sawai =

Japanese musician (1941–2026)

Kazue Sawai (沢井 一恵, Sawai Kazue; 1 January 1941 – 15 February 2026) was a Japanese koto player noted for her performance of contemporary classical music and free improvisation.

== Early life ==
Sawai was born in Kyoto on January 1st, 1941, and began studying koto, at the age of eight, with Michio Miyagi. She later graduated from the Tokyo National University of Fine Arts and Music.

== Musical career ==
Sawai played both the 13-string and 17-string kotos. As a soloist, as well as with her koto ensemble, she performed and worked with John Cage, Toshi Ichiyanagi, Yuji Takahashi, Ayuo, Roberto Carnevale, Sofia Gubaidulina, David Behrman, Carl Stone, and many other composers. She has performed in Japan, North America, and Europe.

== Teaching career ==
Sawai operated a school in Japan, where she taught both Japanese and foreign students. Her students include Michiyo Yagi, Elizabeth Falconer, Shoko Hikage, and Mei Han.

== Personal life and death ==
Sawai was married to the late Tadao Sawai, who was also a koto player and composer. The couple had a son Hikaru Sawai (born 1964), who is also a koto player and composer.

Kazue Sawai died on 15 February 2026, at the age of 85.
