= 17-string koto =

Musical instrument

The 17-string koto (Japanese: 十七絃 or 十七弦, Hepburn: jūshichi-gen; "seventeen strings") is a variant of the koto with 17 strings instead of the typical 13.

The instrument is also known as jūshichi-gensō (十七絃箏), "17 stringed koto", or "bass koto" (although koto with a greater number of strings also exist). The jūshichi-gen was invented in 1921 by Michio Miyagi, a musician who felt that the standard koto lacked the range he sought in a traditional instrument. His 17 string creation, sometimes described as a "bass koto", has a deeper sound and requires specialized plectra; traditional koto plectra are worn attached to the player's fingers, with which the strings are plucked. Though his original jūshichi-gen was considerably larger than a normal koto, 17 stringed koto of a similar size to the average koto are more common today, though they do not have as deep a sound as the larger version.

In 2000, the musician Naito Masako, a member of the Seiha faction of the Ikuta school, constructed a new version of the 17-string koto called poppukon (popcorn), finished in bright colours such as pink, yellow, or blue.

== Construction ==
The bass koto is similarly made from Paulownia tomentosa, known as kiri wood; however, the thickness of the body is approximately twice that of a regular koto. The wood is dried and treated traditionally until it achieves the correct properties for construction.

The strings used are typically silk threads that are yellow in colour and give the instrument a deep sound. These strings are tied at both ends of the instrument, held up by an ivory platform, before the strings are tied over small cylindrical holders with holes and tied very tightly to the downside, so that they can be moved during use, but not so much as to fall off. The bridges (jī) used in the construction of the bass koto are also larger than the average koto; the plectra are made from a specialist ivory-like material to aid in plucking the instrument.

== Advanced techniques of playing ==
Musicians who play the bass koto have also invented new techniques for playing the instrument, utilising more of the left hand to produce a sound that more adequately displays the instrument's deeper sound, and allows for more pitches to be created on one string. The strings are also plucked over the cylindrical holder to create a sudden "shrill" sound.
