= MuchAdrenaline =

- Starring: Tim Deegan; Leah Miller
- Country of origin: Canada
- No. of episodes: 20

Production
- Executive producer: Billy Hussey
- Running time: 60 minutes (time slot)

Original release
- Network: MuchMusic
- Release: 28 August 2006

MuchAdrenaline is a one-hour program on MuchMusic devoted to action sports and music. The series premiered on Monday, August 28 and currently airs on Mondays at 7pm ET.

The series showcases popular (and emerging) action sports from across Canada and around the world including skateboarding, surfing, snowboarding, BMX, motocross, mountain biking and wakeboarding. MuchAdrenaline also plays music videos from bands and artists associated with the action sports lifestyle.
