= Tadao Sawai =

Japanese musician (1938–1997)

Tadao Sawai (沢井 忠夫, Sawai Tadao; 1938 – April 1, 1997) was a Japanese koto player and composer. He was renowned all over Japan for his skill at the koto and also received acclaim for his compositions.

== Early life ==
Born in Aichi Prefecture, Sawai graduated from the Tokyo National University of Fine Arts and Music in 1958.

== Musical career ==
Sawai worked with a number of Western musicians, including Wadada Leo Smith and also released a CD of himself playing Jazzy Bach on the Koto.

Sawai also invented a Koto of his own called the Tadao koto which also creates good sounds.

== Family ==
Sawai was married to Kazue Sawai, also a koto player, and their son Hikaru Sawai is also a musician.

== Discography ==
J.S. Bach Is Alive and Well and Doing His Thing on the Koto, Sawai (first koto), Kazue Sawai (second koto), Hozan Yamamoto (shakuhachi), Sadanori Nakamure (guitar), Tatsoro Takimoto (bass), Takeshi Inomata (drums). RCA Red Seal, 1971, LSC-3227
