= Koto (instrument) =

Japanese plucked string instrument

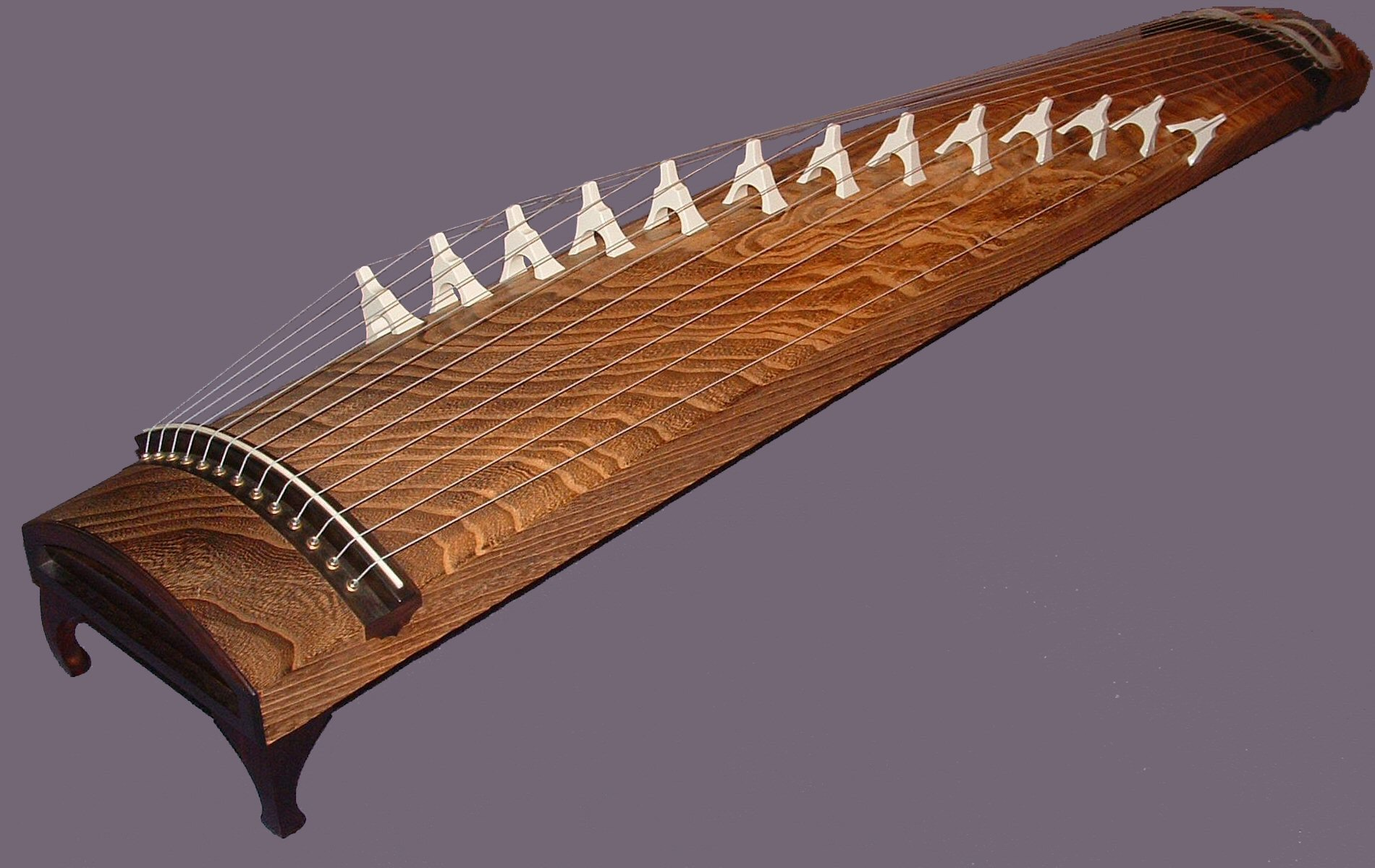

String instrument
- Other names: 13-stringed koto
- Classification: Stringed instrument
- Hornbostel–Sachs classification: 312.22–6 (Heterochord half-tube zither sounded with three plectrums)
- Inventor: Kenjun
- Developed: 12th century

Related instruments
- 17-string koto; Zheng; Yatga; Gayageum; Đàn tranh

The koto (箏 or 琴) is a Japanese plucked half-tube zither instrument, and the national instrument of Japan. It is derived from the Chinese zheng and se, and similar to the Mongolian yatga, the Korean gayageum and ajaeng, the Vietnamese đàn tranh, the Sundanese kacapi and the Kazakh jetigen. Koto are roughly 180 centimetres (6 ft) in length, and made from Paulownia wood (Paulownia tomentosa, known as kiri). The most common type uses 13 strings strung over movable bridges used for tuning, different pieces possibly requiring different tuning. Seventeen-string koto are also common, and act as bass in ensembles. Koto strings are generally plucked using three fingerpicks (tsume), worn on the first three fingers of the right hand.

Koto performance
13-stringed koto performance of the song "Sakura Sakura"

== Names and types ==
The character for koto is 箏, although 琴 is often used. However, 琴 (koto) is the general term for all string instruments in the Japanese language, including instruments such as the kin no koto, sō no koto, yamato-goto, wagon, nanagen-kin, and so on. When read as kin, it indicates the Chinese instrument guqin. The term is used today in the same way.

The term koto appears in the Kojiki in reference to an ancient string instrument in this usage. Variations of the instrument were eventually created, and eventually a few of them would become the standard variations for modern day koto. The four types of koto (gakuso, chikuso, zokuso, tagenso) were all created by different subcultures, but also adapted to change the playing style.

One regional style of the koto is the Tategoto (竪琴) from the Amami Islands. Unlike other varieties of the koto, it is held upright on the lap and played with one hand, may have more strings, is shorter, and is typically strung with steel strings.

== History ==
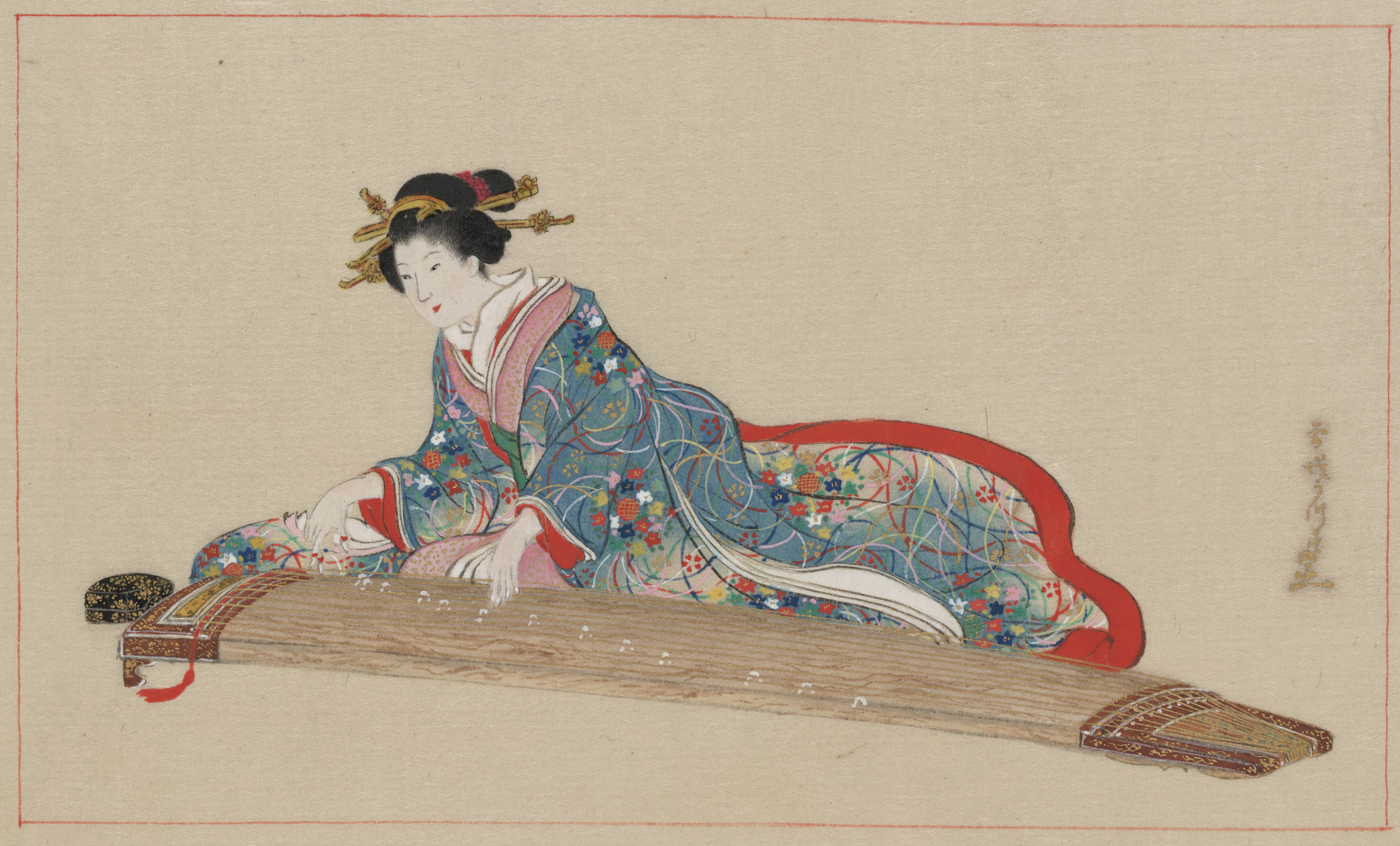
An 1878 depiction by Settei Hasegawa of a woman playing the koto

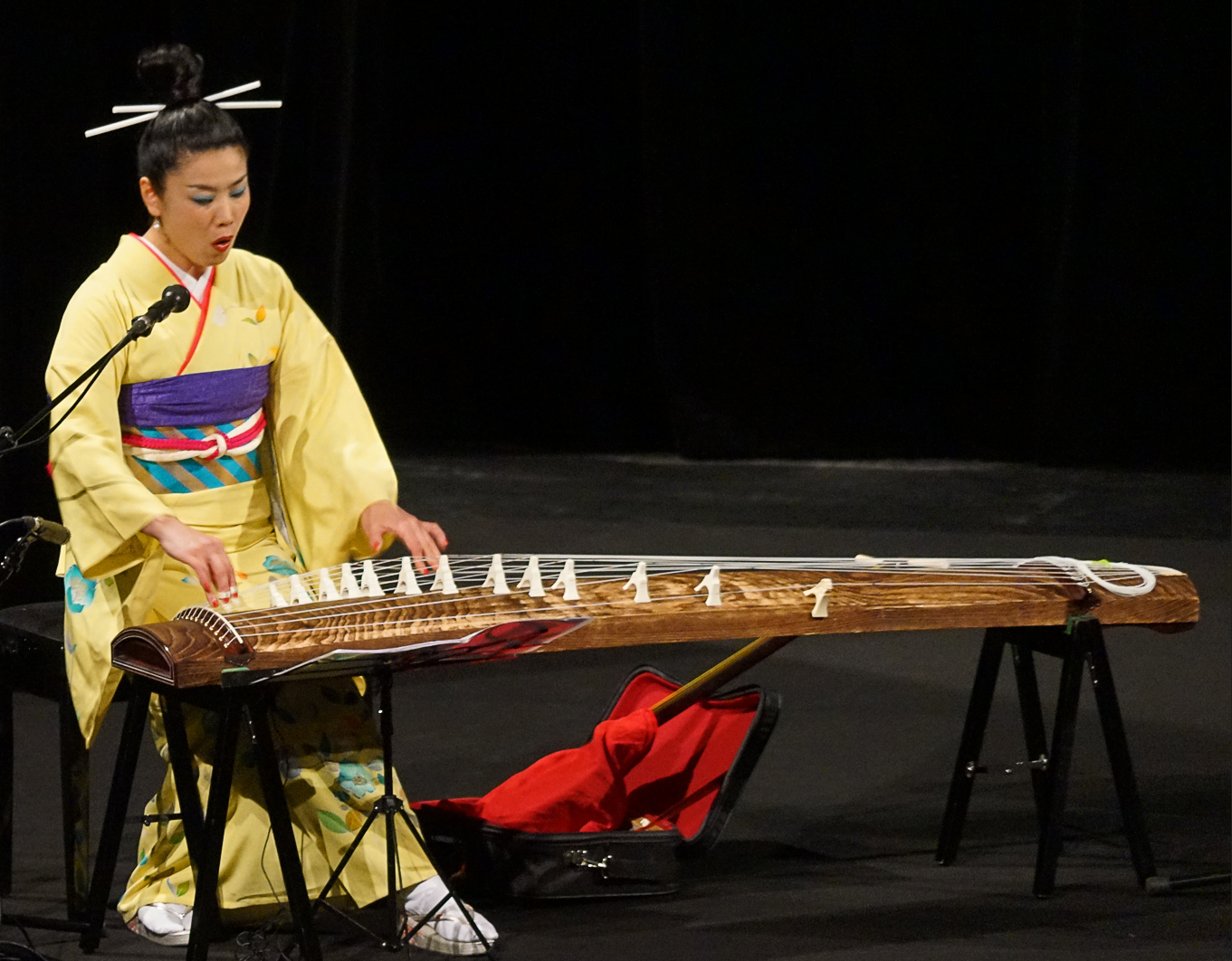
Fumie Hihara playing a 13-string koto

The ancestor of the koto was the Chinese guzheng. It was first introduced to Japan from China in the 7th and 8th centuries. The first known version had five strings, which eventually increased to seven strings. The Japanese koto belongs to the Asian zither family that also comprises the Chinese zheng (ancestral to the other zithers in the family), the Korean gayageum, and the Vietnamese đàn tranh. This variety of instrument came in two basic forms, a zither that had bridges and a zither without bridges.

When the koto was first imported to Japan, the native word koto was a generic term for any and all Japanese stringed instruments. As the number of different stringed instruments in Japan grew, the once-basic definition of koto could not describe the wide variety of these instruments and so the meanings changed. The azumagoto or yamatogoto was called the wagon, the kin no koto was called the kin, and the sau no koto (sau being an older pronunciation of 箏) was called the sō or koto.

The modern koto originates from the gakusō used in Japanese court music (gagaku). It was a popular instrument among the wealthy; the instrument was considered a romantic one. Some literary and historical records indicate that solo pieces for koto existed centuries before sōkyoku, the music of the solo koto genre, was established. According to Japanese literature, the koto was used as imagery and other extra music significance. In one part of The Tale of Genji, the titular character falls deeply in love with a mysterious woman whom he has never seen before, after hearing her playing the koto from a distance.

The koto of the chikuso was made for the Tsukushigato tradition, originally intended only for blind men. Women were forbidden from playing the instrument in the professional world, nor were they allowed to teach it. When these strict rules were relieved, women began to play the koto, with the exception of the chikuso, as its design for the blind led to a decline in use; other koto proved more useful. The two main koto varieties still used today are the gakuso and zokuso. These two have relatively stayed the same, with the exception of material innovations such as the use of plastic, as well as modern material for the strings. The tagenso is the newest addition to the koto family, surfacing in the 19th century. It was purposefully created to extend the range of the instrument and advance the style of play. These were made with 17, 21, and 31 strings.

Perhaps the most important influence on the development of koto was Yatsuhashi Kengyo (1614–1685). Yatsuhashi was a gifted blind musician from Kyoto who vastly extended the limited selection of only six traditional koto songs to a brand-new style of koto music which he called koto kumiuta (箏組歌). Yatsuhashi changed the tsukushi goto tunings, which were based on the older gagaku ways of tuning; and with this change, a new style of koto was born. Yatsuhashi is now known as the "Father of Modern Koto".

A smaller influence in the evolution of the koto is found in the inspiration of a woman named Keiko Nosaka. Nosaka (a musician who won Grand Prize in Music from the Japanese Ministry of Culture in 2002), felt confined by playing a koto with just 13 strings, and created new versions of the instrument with 20 or more strings.

Japanese developments in bridgeless zithers include the one-stringed koto (ichigenkin) and two-stringed koto (nigenkin or yakumo goto). Around the 1920s, Goro Morita created a new version of the two-stringed koto. On this koto, one would push down buttons above the metal strings like the western autoharp. It was named the taishōgoto after the Taishō period.

At the beginning of the Meiji Period (1868–1912), Western music was introduced to Japan. Michio Miyagi (1894–1956), a blind composer, innovator, and performer, is considered to have been the first Japanese composer to combine western music and traditional koto music. Miyagi is largely regarded as being responsible for keeping the koto alive when traditional Japanese arts were being forgotten and replaced by Westernization. He wrote over 300 new works for the instrument before his death in a train accident at the age of 62. He also invented the popular 17-string bass koto, created new playing techniques, advanced traditional forms, and most importantly increased the koto's popularity. He performed abroad and by 1928 his piece for koto and shakuhachi, Haru no Umi ("Spring Sea") had been transcribed for numerous instruments. Haru no Umi is even played to welcome each New Year in Japan.

Since Miyagi's time, many composers such as Kimio Eto (1924–2012) and Tadao Sawai (1937–1997) have written and performed works that continue to advance the instrument. Sawai's widow Kazue Sawai, who as a child was Miyagi's favored disciple, has been the largest driving force behind the internationalization and modernization of the koto. Her arrangement of composer John Cage's prepared piano duet "Three Dances" for four prepared bass koto was a landmark in the modern era of koto music.

For about 150 years after the Meiji Restoration, the Japanese shirked their isolationist ideals and began to openly embrace American and European influences, the most likely explanation for why the koto has taken on many different variations of itself.

== Construction ==
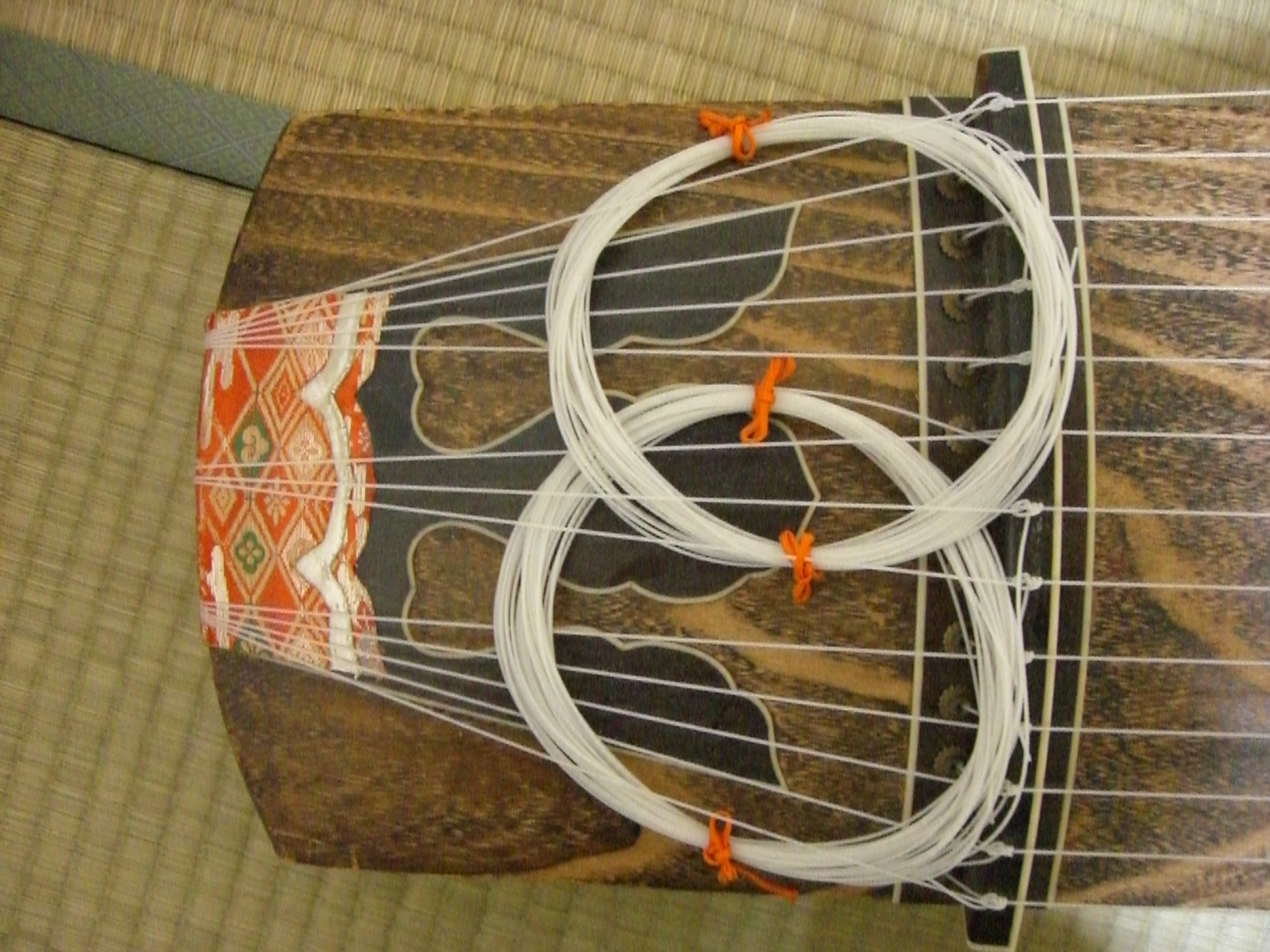
Detail of koto

A koto is typically made of Paulownia wood (known as kiri), although treatment of the wood varies tremendously between artisans. A koto may or may not be adorned. Adornments include inlays of ivory and ebony, tortoise shell, metal figures, etc. The wood is also cut into two patterns, itame (also called mokume), which has a swirling pattern, or straight-lined masame. The straight lined pattern is easier to manufacture, so the swirl raises the cost of production, and is therefore reserved for decorative and elegant models.

The body of a traditional koto is made of Paulownia wood. Every piece of the instrument comes with cultural significance, especially since the koto is the national instrument. The wood is dried and cut into precise measurements. The size of the soundboard on a standard modern koto has remained approximately 182 centimetres (72 in), where in the past it ranged from 152 to 194 centimetres (60 to 76 in).

The bridges (ji) used to be made of ivory, but nowadays are typically made of plastic, and occasionally made of wood. One can alter the pitch of a string by manipulating or moving the bridge. For some very low notes, there are small bridges made, as well as specialty bridges with three different heights, depending on the need of the tuning. When a small bridge is unavailable for some very low notes, some players may, as an emergency measure, use a bridge upside down, though this is unstable and not ideal. Bridges have been known to break during playing, and with some older instruments which have the surface where the bridges rest being worn due to much use, the bridges may fall during playing, especially when pressing strings. There are, of course, various sorts of patch materials sold to fill the holes which cause the legs of a bridge to rest on an unstable area. About 6 feet (1.8 m) long and 1 foot (0.30 m) wide, the koto is traditionally placed on the floor in front of the player, who kneels.

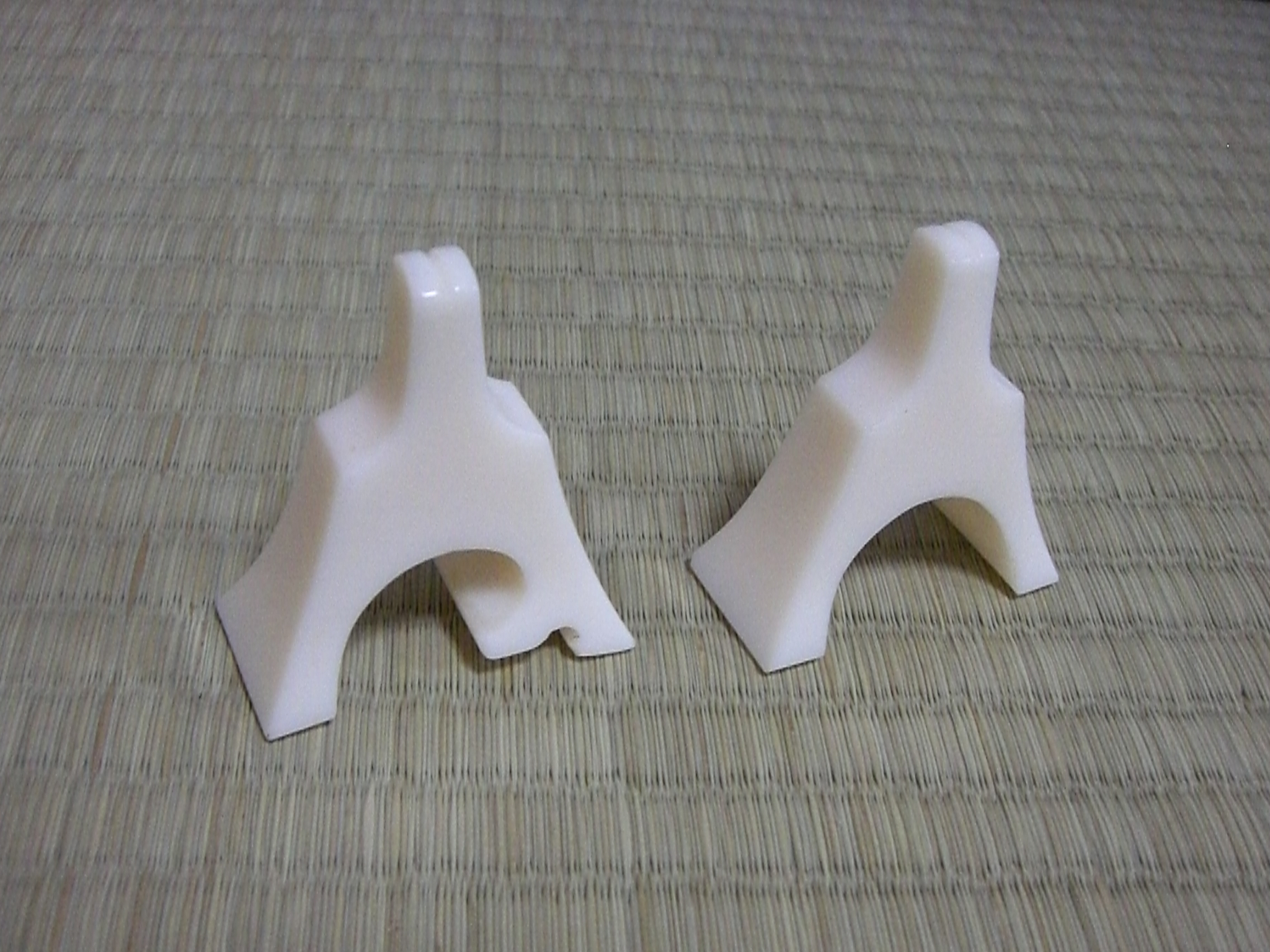
Ji (bridge)

The strings are made from a variety of materials. Various types of plastic strings are popular. Silk strings, typically yellow in color, are still made, despite their higher price and lower durability than modern strings; some musicians prefer them, perceiving a difference in sound quality to modern strings. The strings are tied with a half hitch to a roll of paper or cardboard, about the size of a cigarette butt, strung through the holes at the head of the koto, threaded through the holes at the back, tightened, and tied with a special knot. Strings can be tightened by a special machine, but often are tightened by hand, and then tied. One can tighten by pulling the string from behind, or sitting at the side of the koto, although the latter is much harder and requires much arm strength. Some instruments may have tuning pins (like a piano) installed, to make tuning easier.

The makura ito, the silk thread used in the instrument, is a pivotal part of its construction. This feature was not seen on the speculated nobility-style instruments because they used a more tension of theirs and valued the relict nature of their instruments. The commoners did all the innovations that made the koto not only a sturdy instrument, but more sonically adept. The makura ito was used in paper so the fine silk was in abundance in Japan. As of the beginning of the 19th century, an ivory called makura zuno became the standard for the koto.

For every part of the koto, there is a traditional name which connects with the opinion that the body of a koto resembles that of a dragon. Thus, the top part is called the "dragon's shell" (竜甲, ryūkō), while the bottom part is called the "dragon's stomach" (竜腹, ryūfuku). One end of the koto, noticeable because of the removable colorful fabricshell, is known as the "dragon's head" (竜頭, ryūzu), consisting of parts such as the "dragon's horns" (竜角, ryūkaku) – the saddle of the bridge or the makurazono (枕角) – "dragon's tongue" (竜舌, ryūzetsu), "dragon's eyes" (竜眼, ryūgan; the holes for the strings) and "dragon's forehead" (竜額, ryūgaku) – the space above the makurazuno. The other end of the koto is called the "dragon's tail" (竜尾, ryūbi); the string nut is called the "cloud horn" (雲角, unkaku).

== Koto today ==
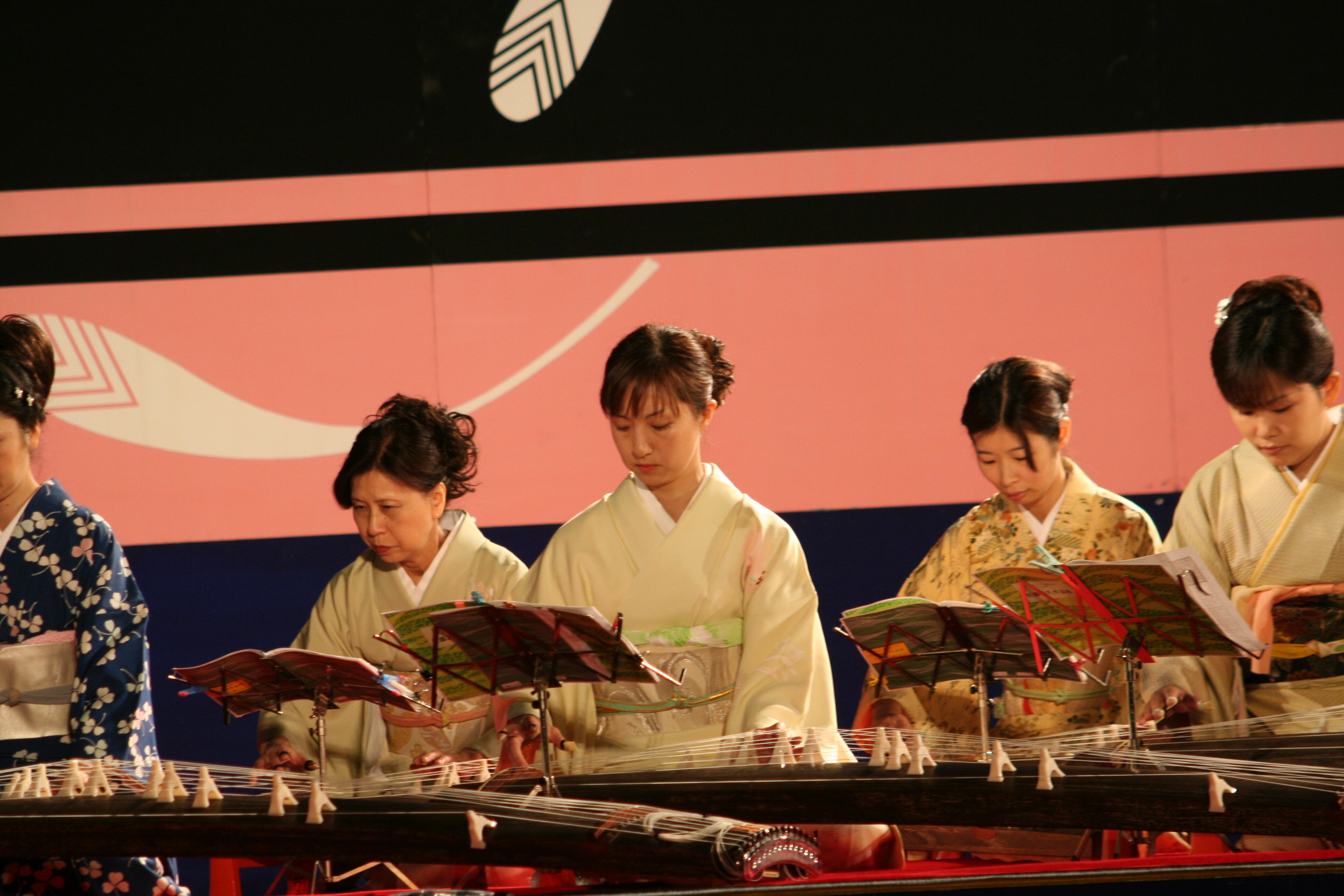
Koto concert at Himejijo kangetsukai in 2009

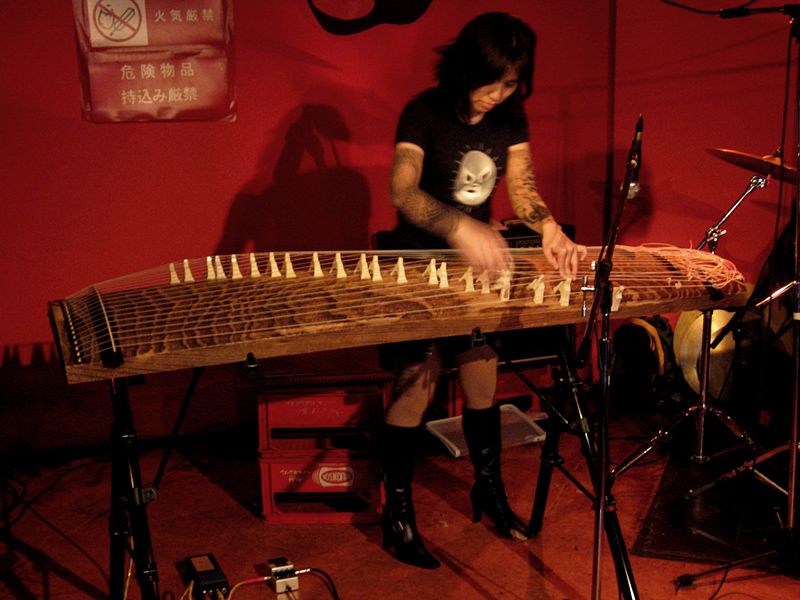
Michiyo Yagi playing a 21-string koto

The influence of Western pop music has made the koto less prominent in Japan, although it is still developing as an instrument. The 17-string bass koto (jūshichi-gen) has become more prominent over the years since its development by Michio Miyagi. There are also 20-, 21-, and 25-string koto. Works are being written for 20- and 25-string koto and 17-string bass koto. Reiko Obata has also made the koto accessible to Western music readers with the publication of two books for solo koto using Western notation. The current generation of koto players, such as American performers Reiko Obata and Miya Masaoka, Japanese master Kazue Sawai, and Michiyo Yagi, are finding places for the koto in today's jazz, experimental music and even pop music. The members of the band Rin' are popular 17-string koto players in the modern music scene.

June Kuramoto of the jazz fusion group Hiroshima was one of the first koto performers to popularize the koto in a non-traditional fusion style. Reiko Obata, founder of East West Jazz, was the first to perform and record an album of jazz standards featuring the koto. Obata also produced the first-ever English language koto instructional DVD, titled "You Can Play Koto". Obata is one of the few koto performers to perform concertos with United States orchestras, having done so on multiple occasions, including with Orchestra Nova for San Diego's KPBS in 2010.

Other solo performers outside Japan include award-winning recording artist Elizabeth Falconer, who also studied for a decade at the Sawai Koto School in Tokyo, and Linda Kako Caplan, Canadian daishihan (grandmaster) and member of Fukuoka's Chikushi Koto School for over two decades. Another Sawai disciple, Masayo Ishigure, holds down a school in New York City. Yukiko Matsuyama leads her KotoYuki band in Los Angeles. Her compositions blend the timbres of world music with her native Japanese culture. She performed on the Grammy-winning album Miho: Journey to the Mountain (2010) by the Paul Winter Consort, garnering additional exposure to Western audiences for the instrument. In November 2011, worldwide audiences were further exposed to the koto when she performed with Shakira at the Latin Grammy Awards.

In March 2010, the koto received widespread international attention when a video linked by the Grammy Award-winning hard rock band Tool on its website became a viral hit. The video showed Tokyo-based ensemble Soemon playing member Brett Larner's arrangement of the Tool song "Lateralus" for six bass and two bass koto. Larner had previously played koto with John Fahey, Jim O'Rourke, and members of indie rock groups including Camper Van Beethoven, Deerhoof, Jackie O Motherfucker, and Mr. Bungle.

In older pop and rock music, David Bowie used a koto in the instrumental piece "Moss Garden" on his album "Heroes" (1977). The multi-instrumentalist, founder, and former guitarist of The Rolling Stones Brian Jones played the koto in the song "Take It Or Leave It" on the album Aftermath (1966).

Paul Gilbert, a popular guitar virtuoso, recorded his wife Emi playing the koto on his song "Koto Girl" from the album Alligator Farm (2000). Rock band Kagrra, are well known for using traditional Japanese musical instruments in many of their songs, an example being "Utakata" (うたかた), a song in which the koto has a prominent place. Winston Tong, the singer of Tuxedomoon, uses it on his 15-minute song "The Hunger" from his debut solo album Theoretically Chinese (1985).

The rock band Queen used a (toy) koto in "The Prophet's Song" on their 1975 album A Night at the Opera. Ex-Genesis guitarist Steve Hackett used a koto on the instrumental song "The Red Flower of Tachai Blooms Everywhere" from the album Spectral Mornings (1979), and Genesis keyboardist Tony Banks sampled a koto using an Emulator keyboard for the band's song "Mama". A koto played by Hazel Payne is featured in A Taste of Honey's 1981 English cover of the Japanese song "Sukiyaki". A synthesized koto appears in their cover of The Miracles' "I'll Try Something New". Steve Howe used a koto in the instrumental break of Asia's single "Heat of the Moment", from their self-titled 1982 album. Howe also played a koto on the Yes song "It Will Be a Good Day (The River)", from the 1999 album The Ladder.

Dr. Dre's 1999 album 2001 prominently features a synthesized koto on two of its tracks, "Still D.R.E." and "The Message". A 2020 acoustic cover of Led Zeppelin's "The Battle of Evermore" by PianoRock feat. Dean McNeill also prominently features a synthesized koto.

== Recordings ==
- Silenziosa Luna (沈黙の月, Chinmoku no Tsuki) / ALM Records ALCD-76 (2008)

== See also ==
- 17-string koto
- Đàn tranh
- Guzheng
- Guqin
- Gayageum
- Kacapi
- Santur
- Se
- Taishōgoto
- Gagaku
