= Michio Miyagi =

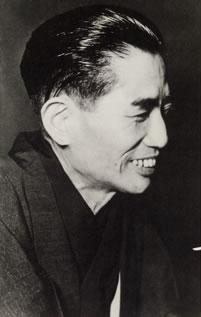
- 宮城道雄

Background information
- Born: April 7, 1894; Kobe, Japan
- Died: June 25, 1956 (aged 62) Kariya, Aichi, Japan
- Instrument: koto

Michio Miyagi (宮城 道雄, Miyagi Michio; April 7, 1894 – June 25, 1956; Japanese pronunciation: [mʲí.jä̀.ɡ̟ʲì | mʲì.ꜜc̟͡ɕí.ó̞, -ɡ̟ʲì mʲì.c̟͡ɕì.ò̞, -ŋ̟ʲì-]) was a Japanese musician, famous for his koto playing.

He was born in Kobe. He lost his sight in 1902, when he was 8 years old, and started his study in koto under the guidance of Nakajima Kengyo II, dedicating the rest of his life to the instrument. In 1907 he moved with his family to Incheon, in southern Korea. When he was 14 years old, in 1909 he finished his first composition, Mizu no Hentai. At 18 he reached the rank of kengyo, the highest rank for a koto performer.

Miyagi moved to Tokyo in 1917, and in 1919 he did his first recital of his own compositions. In 1920, he took part in the Great Recital of the New Japanese Music with Seifu Yoshida and Nagayo Motoori. He was reckoned as an authority in the new Japanese music, achieving notability in the early Shōwa period. In 1925 he participated in one of the first radio presentations in Japan, and in 1929 he signed an exclusive contract with Victor Record Company, current JVC. He composed his most famous piece, Haru no Umi (The Sea in Spring), in 1929.

In 1930 he became a lecturer at the Tokyo College of Music (current Tokyo University of the Arts), until he was appointed professor in 1937. In 1932 French violinist Renée Chemet visited Japan on a concert tour. After hearing Miyagi perform Haru no Umi Chemet arranged the shakuhachi part for violin, which she and Miyagi then recorded for distribution in Japan and Europe. He gained worldwide notability after the issuing of his albums in Japan, United States and UK.

After the Second World War, in 1948, he was appointed to the Academy of Arts of Japan. On 25 June 1956 he died after falling from a train in Kariya, Aichi during one of his tours. He wrote more than 500 pieces, improved Japanese string instruments, and invented new kotos with 17 strings (bass koto) and 80 strings. He was also an essayist, and published more than ten books including Ame no Nenbutsu.

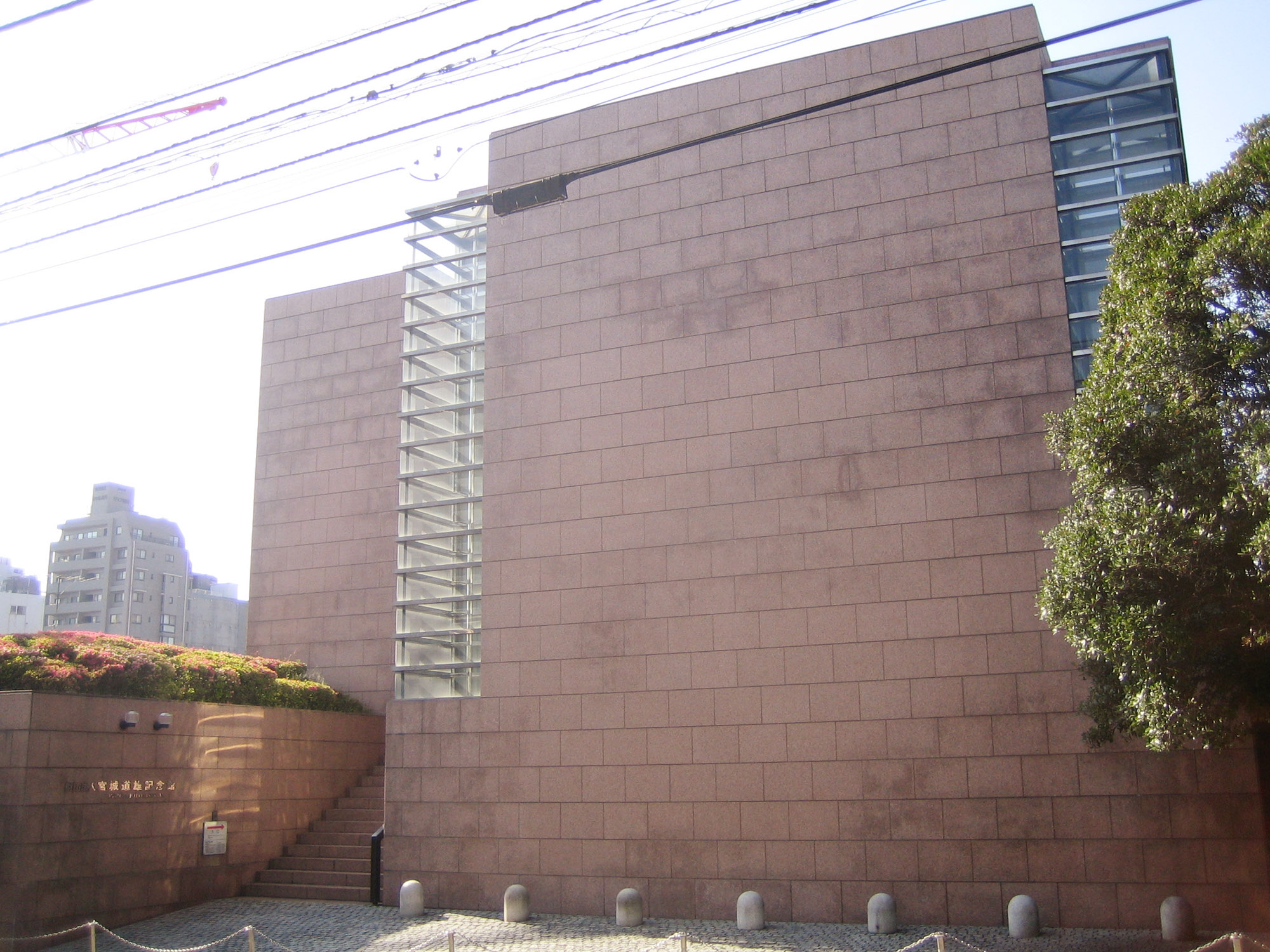
Michio Miyagi Memorial Hall in Shinjuku, Tokyo

== Michio Miyagi Memorial Hall ==
The Michio Miyagi Memorial Hall, Shinjuku City, Tokyo, was opened in 1978 on the site where he spent his last years. The museum includes his personal instruments and artifacts, the library where he composed his music and wrote his essays, a room with his music and videos, a library, lecture hall and music hall for concerts.
