= List of European medieval musical instruments =

This is a list of medieval musical instruments used in European music during the Medieval period. It covers the period from before 5th into the 15th A.D. There may be some overlap with Renaissance musical instruments; Renaissance music begins in the 15th century. The list mainly covers Western Europe. It may branch into Eastern Europe and non-European parts of the Byzantine Empire (Anatolia, northern Africa).

== Percussion ==
Names and variations	Description	Ethnic connections, regions	Pictures	
Adufe Pandeiro	A frame drum brought to Iberia by Muslims and played mainly by women. Used in the charamba in Portugal, a circle dance for couples. The adufe is a square or rectangular frame drum usually made of pine, over which is mounted a goat's skin. The size of the frame usually ranges from 12 to 22 inches on each side, and 1 to 2 inches thick. The skin is stitched on the sides, with the stitches covered by a coloured ribbon. In the interior small seeds, stones or bells are placed to make pleasing sounds. Illustrated examples are decorated, possibly with henna.	Iberia; Portugal; Spain	Musicians, Crusader Bible, MS M.638, fol. 29r Circa 1140 A.D., Sicily. A woman in Muslim clothes plays an adufe percussion instrument, in a painting at the Capella Patina.	1240s A.D., France. An adulf (square held over the group's head) Circa 1320, Barcelona. Woman playing an adufe, from an illustration in the Golden Haggadah.
Bell Beehive bell Sugarloaf bell Gothic rib bell Church bell	From the 1st-4th centuries A.D., Christians were persecuted in the Roman Empire and their religious ceremonies were kept secret. After persecution ended with the 313 A.D. Edict of Milan bells became part of open expression of Christianity. As Christianity became widespread, trumpets, semantrons and bells were used in religious services, including calling worshippers to service. Paulinus of Nola (about 400 A.D.) and Pope Sabinianus (about 604 A.D.) are credited for early use of bells in church. Monks in Byzantine cloisters in Damascus cast some of Christianity's earliest bells (about handbell sized). These were used to broadcast time inside the cloisters. Small cast bells in "Mediterranean tradition" were used by Christians during the first four centuries A.D. In the 5th century Irish Christians made forged bells of sheet metal, and one was carried by Saint Patrick for use as a church bell. By St. Columba's day (521-597 A.D.), both riveted sheet-metal bells of iron and quadrangular cast-bronze bells were in use. The bells were wrung in the Celtic Christian Church, whose missionary work brought Christianity to parts of Europe conquered by Germanic tribes in the fall of the Roman Empire. The bells in Ireland are culturally linked to those in Scotland, Wales, England, Brittany, France, and Switzerland. Based on number of known bells, Ireland may be source of the region's sheet-metal bell type. In 530 A.D., the Benedictine Order began to engineer cast churchbells and set up foundries to make them, supplying them throughout western Europe. Eastern Europe got bells from Constantinople. Cherson in Crimea also made bells. Beehive bells were produced on about the 8th-12th centuries A.D. Sugarloaf bells were made starting in the 12th century. Transitional rib and Gothic rib bells were made from the 12th century and into the 17th century.	Latin, western tradition from church tintinabulum, bell cymbalum, single bell	Saint Patrick's Bell. Iron sheet-metal bell, riveted and coated with bronze. Carried by Patrick, and found in his tomb by Saint Columba. Patrick (died circa 450-500 A.D.). The Bell of St. Ruadhan of Lorrlia (died 584 A.D.). Cast bronze with decorated handle. Bell of Saint Gall (550–645 A.D). Brought with him when he helped bring Christianity from Ireland to Switzerland, founding an abbey. Circa 9th century A.D., Carolingian Empire. Saufang bell, which hung for centuries in St. Cecilia's Church, Cologne. Iron sheets, forged and riveted with copper nails and bronze coated.	Circa 950 A.D., Germany. The bell of Haithabu, a beehive bell. 11th century A.D., Germany. Bell of Hachen, a beehive bell. Early 13th century A.D.,Germany. Evangelist's Bell, Niederwetz, a sugarloaf bell. Poland, church of St Mary Magdalen in Breslau. Sinner's bell, cast 1386, destroyed in 1945.
Handbells Chimes Chime bells Bell chime cymbalum	In the Roman Empire preceding medieval Europe, bells were known. An example is the tintinnabulum, a wind chime made of small bells. Racks of hammer struck bells are called chimes. Chimes from cymbalum (Latin). In Middle Ages (10th-16th centuries) was for indoor instrument made up of 4-12 small bells, hung from a bar and struck with hammers. Beginning 12th century, may have had "large wooden key installed" to make playing easier and to help play bigger bells. Depicted in small sets (4 to 5, 8 to 9). Cymbala, hung in towers became carillons, the bells eventually becoming very large in comparison to the wrack-suspended bells	Latin, western tradition from church tintinabuli, little bell Cymbala, plural, bell chime (multiple bells)	Circa 1066-1083 A.D., Normandy. Bellringers from the Bayeux Tapestry Scene 26, King Edward the Confessor's funeral procession 1448, Germany. Singer with handbell, musician with chimes on a bar. 1330 A.D., Pamplona Cathedral. Bell wringer in a painting by Juan Oliver Circa 1438, Italy. Clavichord, chimes and psaltery by Perinetto da Benevento.	Bell used in monastery to signal times of day for activities; inscribed in Latin TINNIO PRANSVRIS CENATVRIS BIBITVRIS (“I ring for breakfast, dinner, and drinks”). This would have been hung on a rod or bar and played with a mallet. Bell table 1280 A.D., Spain. Miniature from the Cantigas de Santa Maria showing bells hung from a rack resembling church arches (like a carillon?), struck by hammers, but also having clappers. Musicians playing handbells and psaltery, detail from Glasgow University Library MS Hunter 229 (U.3.2), folio 21V
Bell cowbell sheep bell goat bell herd bell harness bell	Used on animals to find them when straying. Used on animal harness.		European animal bells (modern but designs go back to medieval era) Harness bells, detail of painting by Ezra Winter.	1200-1400 A.D., England. A copper-alloy bell, dating from the Medieval period and probably originally serving as a harness pendant. Crotal bells on harness, detail of painting by Ezra Winter.
Bumbulum (legendary) Bunibulum (legendary)	Some medieval scribes theorized about music from the past, or used musical instruments to illustrate doctrinal points. They copied in manuscript a letter from St. Jerome (342-420 A.D.) to Claudius Postumus Dardanus. In it, Jerome tried to explain pagan and Christian musical instruments that are mentioned in the Bible and their allegorical meanings. The letter was reproduced in Christian manuscripts. Starting about 850, scribes began to illustrate the letter in manuscripts, from descriptions of the musical instruments in the letter. Some are allegorical and wouldn't work, such as a horn with three mouthpieces for each of the Holy Trinity to blow through; however in an allegory the Trinity would be expressed by speaking through the four outlets, symbolizing the Four Evangelists. The bumbulum was played by shaking it. It had hanging bells or jingles, suspended from a centerpiece, itself suspended from overhead. It was described as a carpenter's square (signifiying the Holy Cross) with a "four cornered object" hanging from it (signifying Christ on the Cross), with 12 pipes hanging from the object's sides (to jingle and to signify the 12 Apostles).		Circa 850-875 A.D., Benedictine Abbey of Saint Emmeran, Germany. Illustrations of St. Jerome's instruments. Top, the bumbulum; below it the tubae blown through by the Trinity; the two instruments below the tubae are psalteriums; below them are a timpanum and chorus (trumpet that splits into two and rejoins at the exit).	1511 A.D. Germany. Reproduction of line of images in manuscript that go back into the 850s A.D. At left a bumbulum; at right an organum (pipe organ).
Clappers crotalum cliquettes castagnettes	Crotala, from the Carolingian Empire were metal chimes attached to sticks. Cliquettes (also called crotala) were blocks of wood held in the palms. The palm-held blocks could make clicking and rattle noises like castanets. Other similar instruments worldwide include the Thai/Cambodian krap sepha, Indian/Nepali khartal, Uzbek/Tajik qairaq, or North African krakebs. Castagnettes were wooden instrument, made up of sticks that were clapped or beaten together.		4th century A.D., Mariamin (Byzantine Empire). Musian playing crotala. 795 A.D., France or Germany. Carved ivory bookcover, showing man playing crotalus (clappers), from the Dagulf psalter Circa 850 A.D. Musicians in the Utrecht Psalter holding a lyre and crotalus (clappers).	Circa 1250 A.D. Crusader Bible (MS M.638, fol. 39r) cropped for crotala (cliquettes in modern French). Also a bell and a three-hole pipe (with fipple mouthpiece and duct). 1280 A.D. Crotala, cliquettes or clappers (in the woman's hands) from the Musician's Codex, Cantigas de Santa Maria. Circa 1310-1324 A.D., England. Castagnettes or clapping blocks, Gorleston Psalter.
Cymbals Cymbala Carillon	Greek word kymbolon transmitted to medieval Europe through Latin (cymbalum -singular, cymbala -plural). Examples in Roman and Byzantine mosaics show girls dancing with them, in different versions that include finger or palm cymbals, cymbals on sticks and cup-shaped cymbals. The cymbals on sticks (crotala) found their way into art of the Carolingian Empire. In medieval manuscripts, cymbala became bell chimes, bells suspended in series and struck with hammers. Cup shaped cymbals also made their way into medieval manuscripts. Unlike the dancing artwork from Roman and Byzantine mosaics, the Carolingian and later artwork was stripped of sexuality and put into a Christian or Jewish context.		5th century A.D., Roman villa at Agora, Argos, Greece. A dancer in the thiasus plays cymbala and dances with Dionysus. 4th century A.D., Byzantine Empire. Woman playing cymbala (or kymbala) finger or palm cymbals, from the Mosaic of the Female Musicians, Mariamin Late 12th-early 13th century A.D. Musician accompanying David plays the cymbala with hammers, and another also plays cymbala (cup-shaped cymbals).	970 A.C. Cymbals in the Valcavado Beaus, Spain Cymbals in the Golden Haggadah, circa 1320
Drum	The only drums in Europe reaching into ancient times were "Semitic frame drums", such as the Greek and Roman tympanum. Larger drums were introduced from "West Asia" in the medieval period. They were played as timekeepers, marking the beat, their "metrical development" not developed yet.	drum, English, starting in the 16th century. tambour, French tamburo, Italian trommel, German	11th century A.D, Byzantine Empire. Drummer with stylized drumstick. Circa 1315 A.D., Macedonia. Drum, cymbals and recorder. This drum does not have a snare.	Early 12th century, England. Jongleur in a bear suit playing a drum in "profane music". From PSALTERIUM TRIPLEX, St John's College Cambridge, manuscript B.18, folio 1r
*Frame drum	See pandeiro, tabor "A tympanum is a piece of skin or leather stretched over a piece of wood on one side." —Isidore of Seville, about 600 A.D. The frame drum in use in Europe before the bigger drums arrived from West Asia can be called tambourines today. Tympanum was used as a name, as well as tabor. These were wooden rings with leather covering one side. At first there were no jingles, as became common. A variant was the pandeiro, introduced with Muslim invasions and pictured in manuscripts in Spain and Sicily. Some tabors could be frame drums, but other grew wider than the hand-held ring which we call tambourine today. Tof was the Hebrew instrument which Miriam played, "most commonly translated" into English as timbrel Near eastern origin, used by Gauls, Greeks, Romans (tympanum), Egyptians, Assyrians. Jingles were probably originally separate from this instrument. Also related to Daff. When jingles are attached, the instrument is classified as a type of rattle, a "frame wrattle," in which the rattles (or jingles) strike the object to which they are attached. A timbrel or Basque tamborello was a "single-skin frame drum with cymbals" (modern tambourine), while a "single-skin frame drum" without jingles could also be labeled tamburin or bendir. The bendir is also a Muslim frame drum with two snares from North Africa, whose name "probably derives from a Spanish word."	Tympanum, Latin Tympanon, Greek Tof Timbrel Tambourine Bendir Basque tamborello	3rd century A.D., Tunisia (Roman Empire). Maenad playing a tympanum. 1300-1325 Belgium/Netherlands. Angel with tambourine in Maastricht Book of Hours, folio 129R 14th century, England. Woman with tambourine or timbrel, with both jingles and a snare.	1320 A.D., Barcelona, from the Golden Haggadah; Miriam was known for playing the timbrel 1474, Italy. Woman playing a tambourine, from "The Assumption of the Virgin" by Matteo di Giovanni.
Hourglass drum	Images in miniatures in the Cantigas de Santa Maria and the Valcavado Beatus show an hourglass drum was in use in Spain. Such drums are used in northern Africa and may have entered Europe with the Moorish soldiers who conquered the Iberian Peninsula. The drum also had been painted in Sicily, another place in Europe where Islamic and Christian cultures met.		Circa 1140 A.D., Sicily. Woman in Muslim clothes playing an hourglass drum, from a fresco in the ceiling of the Cappella Palatina. Circa 850 A.D., Carolingian Empire. Musician with hourglass drum (right), along with rotte (lyre) and harp.	970 A.D., Spain. Hourglass Drum in the Valcavado Beatus, folio 199V 1280 A.D., Spain. Woman in Muslim clothing playing an hourglass drum, Cantinas de Santa Maria, Codex of the Musicians, Cantiga 300.
Jew's harp			Circa 11th-15th century A.D. Jaw Harp made of copper alloy, found in Rutland. The instrument is missing its tongue.	Angel playing a guimbarde or Jew's harp, crypt of Cathédrale Notre-Dame de Bayeux
Nakers	Appears in English writings from 1352 to 1440 European adaptation of kettledrum from Near East, the naqqâra. Singular naker but played in pairs.	nakers, Middle English nacaire, French nacchera, Italian nacara, Spanish	One man plays nakers on the move, carried on the shoulders of another man, circa 1338–1410 in Tournai, Belgium; from the Bodleian Library MS. Bodleian 264, pt. I, folio 58r.	1417, Czechoslovakia. Troubadors playing nakers and vielle, from the Olomouc Bible, folio 276R
Rattle Jingles Jingle bells Sleigh bells Vessel rattle Crotal Shaker Frame rattle (see tambourine) Row or rod rattles Crotalus Ratchet	Rattles in the medieval period included vessel wrattles (crotals) and rod rattles and frame rattles. See also adulfe, clappers or cliquettes, tambourine, triangle Crotals, also known as jingle bells, were two hemispherical, slotted sheets of metal soldered together, bulging where they connected the sheets into a ball. There was a pellet inside the ball. Historical uses included use by nobility on clothing, armor, tents and knights' horses and dogs, use by ladies for dancing (such as girls wearing bells ""à la morisque" around their hips, arms and ankles" for the reception of Charles V in Spain), and use by the fool as part of his garb (the fool's cap). Row or rod rattles; rattles strung on a straight or ring-shaped rod. Medieval triangles are illustrated with rattles in this manner.		1448, Germany. Triangle with rod rattles attached. Circa 834 A.D., Norway. Oseberg metal wrattle, found in a grave in Oseberg. Jester wearing crotal bells on the bottom of his tunic. 1473, Germany. Angel with crotals (crotal bells or rattles).	1448 A.D., Germany. Crotals (crotal bells). Also considered rattles. Crotal rattle on the end of a handle. Two metal halves welded together (the bulge in the center). Statue of a Jester or Fool wearing Cap and bells.
Cog rattle Clatter Crotalus matraca Grager Ratchet	Has been used among Catholic Christians in religious ceremonies to replace bells. Among Catholics has been used to replace bells between the Gloria of the Mass of the Last Supper on Maundy Thursday and the Easter Vigil. Among Jewish people a ratchet is used to make noise by the congregation during the celebration of Purim. Sephardi Jews immigrating to Spanish imperial holdings in the Americas following their 1492 expulsion from Spain brought gragers for celebrating Purim, which could pass as the matracha of Catholic usage.		Wooden rattle	Wooden grogger or grager (Purim Noisemaker)
Semantron (Greek: σήμαντρον) Lignum sacrum Naqus (Arabic: ناقوس) Toacă (Romanian)	Wooden percussion board, struck with a hammer like a bell. These may be hung horizontally or vertically. Smaller versions may be handheld. In monasteries, they are used to call the monks. Used in Greek Orthodox during Easter week. These are still in use in Eastern Orthodox monasteries and may be made of wood or metal.	Greece Macedonia Bulgaria Romania Russia Serbia Armenia Israel Syria	Circa 1150-1200 A.D., Byzantine Empire. The priest Themel drives off the Arabs of Tarsus, Cilicia, with his semantron. Miniature in the Greek Chronicle Madrid Illuminated Manuscript des Skylitzes. Chapter XI, fol. 132r Monk with a semantron in the form of a double paddle, Sinaia Monastery, Romania.	12th-13th century A.D., Sicily. A man plays the semantron with a hammer. Madrid Skylitzes, Madrid, National Library, codex vitr. 26-2, folio 28v. Musunoaiele Orthodox Monastery, Romania. Semantron with holes on each end for hanging, a thin center to handhold, and a mallet.
Tabor Pipe and tabor	Early snare drum, narrow body compared to width of drumhead, 12th century and later. The ensemble that played a three-hole pipe and "small drum" was used throughout western Europe to provide music for dances and was first seen in southern France and northern Spain in the 12th century. A player played both instruments at the same time. Early drums in Europe were "side drums", slung at the players side or worn over their shoulder, or hung on left arm. These were tabors, double sided with snares of rope (possibly only on one side. The drums were either beaten with two sticks, or played as a pipe and tabor combination. Larger drums come on the scene by the 1500s. A variation in France uses the tambourine à cordes or tambourine de Bearn, in which a dulcimer or string drum replaces the snare drum.	tabur, Old French tabour	1244-1254 A.D., France. Frame drum or tabor, from Crusader Bible, MS M.638, fol. 29r. 1433, Italy. An angel holds a small duct flute or pipe and beats a drum.	Pipe and tabor, from the Cantigas de Santa Maria, circa 1280 A.D. Circa 1473, Germany. Angel with pipe and tabor. Pipe and tabor. The string that holds the tablor in place is visible at the musician's neck.
Tambourine de Bearn tambourin à cordes string drum tutu-panpan ttun-ttun buttafuoco	Instrument played mainly in the Iberian Peninsula and Spanish influenced areas of Italy. Appears earlier in sculpture and miniatures as a simple squared box with strings. Later the box becomes more elaborate. Played with 3-hole pipe. Some images shows play using 2 sticks, as well as one stick and fingers.		1447-1450, Spain. Angel playing a string drum or Tambor de cordes, from a painting by Catalan painter Jaume Huguet. 17th century, Spain. Convento de la Concepción, Epila, Zaragoza, Aragón, Spain.	Circa 1489—1491,Rome. Tambourine de Bearn. This instrument is still used in Basque-language areas in Spain, called the ttun-ttun. Nakers, string drum and gittern, from Evangeliarium, Sog Troppauer-Evangeliar, Cod 1182 page 2
Triangle			Circa 1457–1461, Oratory of San Bernardino, Perugia. Nakers and a triangle.	Musician plays triangle in Olomouc Bible, folio 276R

== String instruments ==
Names and variations	Description	Ethnic connections, regions	Pictures	
Citole				Circa 1310 A.D. Citole from the Robert de Lisle Psalter.
Clavichord	Clavichords were in existence in the "early years of the 15th century." Word clavichord found in text from 1404. Earliest known image dates to 1425, in an altarpiece carving in Minden, Germany.		1448, Germany. Clavichord, Die 24 Alten (The 24 Elders), Coburg State Library, Ms Cas 43	Circa 1438, Italy. Detail of a clavichord from a painting by Perinetto da Benevento.
Crwth chorus crot crowd rote Gue Jouhikko Stråkharpa Talharpa	Welsh and Middle English words for the 3-5 string bowed instrument included crwth, chorus, crot, and crowd. Irish used cruit (indicating a lyre and later a frame harp). Seen in Wales into the 18th century. Modern surviving instruments come from Karelia (jouhikko), the Estonian hiiukannel, Swedish stråkharpa, and Norwegian Talharpa. It was seen throughout the British Isles, from where it traveled through the Shetland Islands and Norway to Sweden, ending up in Estonia and Finland. Probably related to the rotte lyre of Germany and Anglo-Saxon England; the direction the plucked instrument moved between cultures and who had it first is unknown.		Crwth, Westminster Abbey, 14th century A.D. An Estonian man playing the hiiu kannel (or, talharpa), ca. 1920. Talharpa, Norway.	1029 A.D. King David playing the crwth from the Troparium et prosarium Sancti Martialis Lemovicensis, BNF Latin 1118, folio 104. Watercolor from the 18th century of a Welsh crwth. Stråkharpa, bowed lyre from Sweden, also called Jouhikko in Finland. Circa 1125, Farfa Abbey, Italy. Men playing trumpet and crwth. The abbey was founded circa 681 A.D. during an era of Christian missions by the Irish. Bibliothèque nationale de France, Latin 2508, folio IIv.
Dulcimer Hammer dulcimer	A box zither; see psaltery. "Little is known of the dulcimer before the mid-15th century." Earliest known depiction is on ivory carving for book cover, 12th century A.D.		Circa 1131-1143 David (playing hammered dulcimer) and his musicians, detail of ivory bookcover of Melisende Psalter, Egerton MS 1139/1, British Library Circa 1496–1498, France. Allegory of Music, in a manuscript of Echecs amoureux, Bibliothèque nationale de France, Français 143, fol. 65v 1473, Germany. Angel with a hammer dulcimer. 15th century, France. Hammer dulcimer from Chronicles of Lord JEHAN FROISSART, Français 2644, folio 154v.	Hammer Dulcimer in painting Assumption of Mary by Bartolomeo della Gatta, circa 1473. 1448, Germany. Hammer Dulcimer, Detail from Die 24 Alten (The 24 Elders), Coburg State Library, Ms Cas 43. 1491, Italy. Angels playing hammered dulcimer and harp, detail from fresco in the Madonna-del-Brichetto, Morozzo.
Fiddle see also Gusle Kemenche Kemenche of the Black Sea Kemane of Cappadocia Shikepshine Lyra Lijerica Calabrian lira politiki lyra Cretan lyra Gadulka Gudok Pochette Rebec Arabella Rabel Rebab Vielle Vihuela de arco			David playing music on a fiddle. From St. Albans Psalter, page 56.	14th century, Flemish artwork. Fiddle in the Reliquary of Saint Ursula. Fiddles such as this have been labeled fiddle, rabel and vielle. Names don't imply different instruments, but possibly reveal variations in music traditions. Fiddle from Theodore Psalter, folio 191R, 11th century A.D., Byzantine Empire
Gittern				
Guitarra latina	One writer has summed up the guitarra latina, which is not well defined, saying "For musicians in Alfonso's time it may have meant only 'a plucked stringed instrument: not the Muslim one.'"		Instrument on left has been called guitarra latina and citole. Instrument on right has been called guitarra morisca (Moorish guitar) and vihuela peñola (quill plucked guitar).	Fiddle at left could be called a vielle. Instrument on left has been called both guitarra latina and citole.
Guitarra morisca			unknown guitarra unknown guitarra	Possible guitarras morisca. The Moors (if they mean Africans) had a tradition of wood-bowed lutes covered with leather. Arab/Persian Muslims had a different carved wood with leather tradition (barbat and gambus). Either group was called Moors in Spain.
Medieval harp (Medieval form of the modern harp) Celtic harp Irish Harp cláirseach Scottish harp clàrsach Breton telenn Welsh Harp telyn	Further information: Origin of the harp in Europe Not counting the ancient Greek harps, earliest depictions of harps in Europe include examples in Scotland (the Nigg Stone, late 8th century) and Ireland (early images in stone carvings appear to show oblong, c-shaped and triangular harps or lyres.). Other early works can be seen from France, such as the ivory cover to the Dagulf Psalter in France and the 9th century illustrations in the Utrecht Psalter. Harps were strung throughout Europe with gut strings. Exceptions include Ireland (where strings were of metal) and Wales (where portable harps used horsehair strings through the 17th century A.D.). For comparison of harps from across the ancient and medieval world, look at angular harps, arched harps, and konghou.		Circa 850 A.D., Utrecht Psalter, France. Anglo-Saxon drawn illustration of harp and cythara. Circa 1000 A.D., England. Anglo-Saxon drawing of a harper. Bodleian Library MS. Junius 11 folio 54 Harp from Theodore Psalter, 11th century A.D., Byzantine Empire 12th century A.D. France. David playing harp, a musician playing cornett at his feet, a vielle player behind him.	Circa 790-799 A.D., Nigg Stone, from Nigg, Highland, Scotland. Late 10th-11th century A.D., England. Drawing from Anglo Saxon manuscript. This has been called a Welsh harper. Circa 1000-1100 A.D. Ireland. Early depiction of a cláirseach. Earlier depictions are known, but with different shapes. Circa 1200 A.D, England. David playing a harp. Resembles Celtic harp. Circa 1280 A.D., Spain. Sephardic Jewish musicians playing harps in the Musicians Codex of the Cantigas de Santa Maria.
Lute			Rebec or rebab (left), lute right.	Circa 1376, Spain. Lute player, detail from Mare de Déu de la Llet (Our Lady of Milk) by Lorenzo Zaragoza.
Lyra Byzantine lyra Cretan lyra	See rebec below Byzantine version of rebec. Sachs said, "under the names fiddle, vièle, viola, became the principle bowed instrument in Europe."		Later versions of the Cretan lyra, from a museum in Athens.	Circa 900 – 1100 A.D. Lyra on a Byzantine ivory casket, Museo Nazionale, Florence
Lyre Anglo-Saxon lyre Hearpe Germanic lyre Rotte Irish lyre Crot, cruth	Germanic lyre, used in northwestern Europe in the early medieval period (circa 450 A.D.) into the 13th century. There are 21 mentions of the lyre in Anglo-Saxon poetry, five of these in Beowulf.	*Hearpe (OEng): Round lyre; Viking lyre, Scandinavian lyre; harpa, hörpu (ONorse); Anglo-Saxon lyre; cruð (OEng); cruit (OIrish), crot; crowd (MidEng); chrotta (OHGer, Latin); hruozza (OHGer); lyra, lira, lire (MedLatin); rota (OProv); rotta (OHGer, OProv, MedLatin); rote (OFr, MidEng); rotte (MidHGer); sambuca (MedLatin)	Trossingen lyre. Found in a 6th-century grave in Trossingen, Germany. 1025-1075 A.D., Germany. Rotte (or Rotta) round lyre. 1240 and 1260, Germany.	Five-string lyre from the Durham Cassiodorus, 8th-century A.D., England King David with his lyre, Vespasian Psalter, 8th century A.D. Kravic lyre, excavated at the Kravic farm in Numedal, Norway. Made of pine with seven strings. Woman with lyre, Germany circa 1125-1150, from the Zwiefalten Passionale
Monochord	The monochord was a theoretical instrument illustrated in religious miniatures. A single string zither, which could produce different notes by pressure and plucking.		Man with monochord and chime bells, from the PSALTERIUM TRIPLEX, St John's College, B.18, folio 1r	Early 12th century A.D. Monochord, illustrated in manuscript of Anicius Manlius Severinus Boëthius, Cambridge, University Library Ii.3.12, fol. 61v. 1473, Germany. Angel with a monochord.
Nyckelharpa	Played by bow across strings; keys on the neck raised strings up to be sounded.	viola a chiavi, Italian	1408, Siena, Italy. Viola a chiavi (key viola).	1450-1500, Sweden. Nyckelharpa played by angel.
Organistrum (large form of medieval hurdy-gurdy) Symphonia Hurdy-gurdy	Organistrum, an early form of hurdy-gurdy, probable ancestor of later hurdy-gurdies. Played in churches and monastic schools until the 13th century A.D. After 13th century the instrument declined, and fell into disuse in the 14th. Outside of the church it was used for popular music and folk music, and later by beggars. Initially a fiddle shaped instrument with a hand crank, which turned a wheel. The wheel rubbed against all the strings at once making them sound. Strings were sounded simultaneously, with outer strings acting as drones and center strings (which the keys activated) used for melody. At first it was played by two individuals: one turned the crank while the other worked "key rods" to change the musical pitch of the strings. As the instrument became a smaller, one-person instrument, key rods became "push levers". The new mechanism required that the instrument be tilted as it was played. In the 10th century A.D., Odo of Cluny wrote a work (Quomodo organistrum construatur) that helped readers make an instrument.	organae instrumentum, Latin organistrum, circa 942 A.D-14th century. symphonia, 12th-16th centuries hurdy-gurdy, starting 18th century symphonie, chifonie, armonie, Vielle à roue, French Leier, German gaita del pobre, vihuela de rueda, sinfonía, chifonía, zanfoña, Spanish	12th century A.D., Spain, Organistrum" of the Portico of Glory, Santiago de Compostela. 1340, Germany. Organistrum or Leier.	14th century A.D., Spain. Organistrum of the Triptych in the Monastery of Piedra, Zaragoza. 1280 A.D., Spain. Symphonia, a name used for the hurdy-gurdy or organistrum from the 12th century on. 1325-1340 A.D., England. Woman with symphonia, Luttrell Psalter, Add MS 42130, folio 81v 1473, Germany. Angel with a Leier.
Psaltery			1390 A.D., Monastery of Piedra, Spain. Triangular psaltry. circa 1029-1050, Germany. Psaltery played vertically, with musician standing. King David and musicians, frescoe at the Philanthropinon monastery, Ioaninna.	1280 A.D. Cantigas de Santa Maria. Psaltery being played with two hands, probably base at bottom to treble strings higher. 1380 A.D., Florence, Italy. King David playing psaltery.
Rabel	Fiddle, probably variation of rebec. Survives today in Basque speaking areas; historically had leather soundboard; modern instruments may have wooden soundboard. The instrument traveled to the Spanish colonies in America, where it can be found today in Panama.	arrabel robel rovel arribata (Basque) xirribika (Basque)	1170 A.D. Fiddle player with flutist. Glasgow University Library MS Hunter 229 (U.3.2), folio 21V Modern Galacian rabel Musicians from the arch of the 12th Century A.D. West portal of Santo Domingo Church, Soria, Spain Rabel from Cantabria, at the Ethnographic Museum of Cantabria	Unnamed fiddle. Possibly rabel or vihuela de arco or rebec. Santiago Catedral Quintana 18th century, Cantabria. Rabel constructed in area where tradition still existed. Asturias. An arrabita or rabela (Basque) with a wooden resonance box in the shape of a figure 8 and a leather cover. It has three gut strings. The bow has a string of white bristles. Rabel at the Ethnographic Museum of Cantabria
Rebab Rabé morisco	In the late 8th century A.D. r-bab (rabāb) was used in Arabic for a plucked boat-shaped lute. The name would also be used for bowed spike lutes by the 900s A.D., mentioned by Al Farabi. The boat-shaped lute would become bowed as well, used in northern Africa as the Maghreb rebab and in Andalusia, becoming the rebec. Cytharas in early copies of Commentary on the Apocalypse were plucked lutes; these lutes were later shown bowed. Bowed instruments entered Europe from the Islamic world in "Moorish Spain and Byzantium. Rebab is a word for various kinds of fiddle in the Muslim world. Spelling is loose, because Arabic does not write down vowels sounds. Rabab, rebab, rubab, ribab have all been used, and some of them are used for plucked instruments in Asia as well.		Bowed instrument resembling Maghreb rebabs. Spanish and Catalonian names for this include Rebac and Rabel (both are instruments played on the arm, rather than the knee), but its shape closely resembles these. circa 1437. Angel performing for Mary, Queen of Heaven playing a rebab. Panel of the Altarpiece of Santa María la Mayor of Albalate del Arzobispo (province of Teruel). It is preserved in the Museum of Zaragoza.	Rebabs from 1280 A.D. that resemble modern Maghreb rebabs. These have also been called rabé morisco (Moorish rebecs). Instrument seen only in Cantigas de Santa Maria. Resembles guitarra but is played vertically like a rebab or a later viol (viola de gamba or vihuela de gamba). Unlike these, it is shown played vertically while standing. Also resembles gusle.
Rebec	Western European version of the lyra. Europeans adapted the Near Eastern rabāb to Western music. The Byzantines called their version Lyra (harkening to Greek musical instruments), while in Spain northward the rabāb became rebab, rebec, rabel, rubebe. Eastward from the Byzantine empire, it became lirica (among Croats), gudok (Russia), gusla and gadulka (Bulgaria). Rabāb was glossed as Lyra in the 11th century. Where rebec and rubebe were used, rubebe disappeared from use after the mid-1400s. One version had two strings, tuned a fifth apart. Another had a wooden body with five strings, "identical to the rabāb of the Arabs." A version with three strings tuned in fifths and lateral pegs became the typical instrument used into the Renaissance.	rebec (France, England) rubebe (France) rybybe (England) ribeca (Italy) ribebe (Italy)	1509, Bruges. Rebec player with 3-string instrument Rabel or possibly rebec. Line around edge of soundboard indicates this instrument had a skin soundboard.	11th century A.D. Rebec or fiddle from Harley manuscript 4951, folio 297V in the British Library. 1330 A.D. Pamplona Cathedral. Rebec player with 2-string instrument. Renaissance era rebec with rose soundhole.
Rotte	The name rotte was used for lyres first; the name began to be applied to a harp-like psaltery about the 12th century A.D. Often confused with harps in illustrations. Church writers in the Carolingian Empire had limited understanding of earlier instruments, such as the angular vertical harp. Descriptions from the 4th-5th centuries of this instrument caused confusion in the 10th-12th centuries by artists creating miniatures in manuscripts.	zither harp triangular psalterium	Two of the 24 Elders of the Apocalypse with a psaltery and rota, Santo Domingo de Soria One of the 24 Elders of the Apocalypse with a rota, Santo Domingo de Soria 1150-1159 A.D., Armenian Kingdom of Cilicia. Digenes Akritas and his wife Eydokia, from the romance story Digenes Akritas. Digenes' hand is gripping the instrument on its far side, showing it to be solid, a psaltery-playing technique. From silver Byzantine/Armenian bowl in the Hermitage Museum.	Circa 1100 A.D., Italy. King David playing rotte accompanied by a man playing fiddle, from the Psalter of Polirone, Mantua, Teresiana Library, ms. 340, f. 1v-2r. 1280 A.D., Spain. A king and a musician play the Rota. Cantigas de Santa Maria, Codex of the Musicians. 13th century, Spain. King David playing a probable rotte, Cathedral of Santiago de Compostela. Harps were stylized at this point; this instrument does not have obvious soundbox as on a harp (either deep or wide to create a sound chamber).
Tambouras				11th century A.D., Byzantium. Tambouras and fingerhole trumpet.
Tromba marina Trumpet marine				1448 A.D., Germany. Tromba marina.
Vielle Vièle			Modern reproduction of vielle. Modern reproduction of vielle or viola de arco. 1417 A.D. Italy, Painting Madonna of the Belvedere by Ottaviano Nelli	1280 A.D., Spain. Possible vielles. Could also be vihuela de arco 1310 A.D., England. Vielle in the Ormesby Psalter.
Vihuela Viola	In the Iberian Peninsula, small lutes are pictured, which have been considered as possible cytharas and citoles. In Portugal, the tradition remained into the modern era, the instruments called violas. They were vihuelas in Spain. Vihuela eventually became a large guitar-like instrument of the Renaissance. Violas remained small. The name viola has been reused for a variety of instruments including viola da gamba, viola (a modern fiddle).		1175 A.D., Rylands Beatus 1125-1150, Zwiefalten Passionale. Two men (troubadours?) with musical instruments: a small figure-8 guitar (right) and a set of panpipes (left).	1175 A.D., Rylands Beatus 1175 A.D., Rylands Beatus
Vihuela de arco Viola de arco Vihuela de arco pequeña (small bowed vihuela)	The vihuela de arco may be a variant of the vielle. Spain had a variety of fiddles (which predate the violin) in the cathedral artwork and manuscript miniatures.		Possibly the vihuela de arco (bowed vihuela) and vihuela de penola (quill plucked vihuela) The bowed instrument could be called a vielle	Vihuela de arco (bowed vihuela). The downward bowed fiddles came to be called Viols, as in Viola de gamba (viol of the legs). Vihuela was the Spanish name, and in Spain the vihuelas became plucked more than bowed. Spain, "second third of 10th century". Vihuelas de arco or Violas de arco played with a bow. From Commentary on the Apocalypse, Codice VITR 14.1.
Zither				

== Wind instruments ==
Names and variations	Description	Ethnic connections, regions	Pictures	Pictures
Albogón	See reedpipes below Double-reed instrument or type of shawm, possibly adapted from Muslim al-buq horn.			1280 A.D., Spain. Two musicians in Muslim clothing play the Albogón (left) and hourglass drum. From Cantiga 300 of the Cantigas de Santa Maria, Codex of the Musicians, folio 268v.
Alboka Hornpipe Pibgorn Pinole Zhaleika	See reedpipes below Traditional instruments of shepherds. Reedpipes in which the reed body has been replaced by another material such as wood or bone. The single reed (once part of the body of the reedpipe) is now separated; it is now inserted into the instrument's body. The other end of the reed is inserted into the musicians mouth and blown through to produce sound. Hornpipes have a protective cup over the reed, to blow into. Crumhorns also use this protected reed system, though with double reeds. Alboka, Spanish hornpipe. The musician blowns into a horn cup, which channels his breath through one or more single reeds. Each reed is connected to pipe with fingerholes. Gaita (Iberian Peninsula) Gaita gastore, Spanish reed pipe, wooden body with single reed (no cover) and horn bell. Pibole, French reed pipe, wooden or bone body, single reed (no cover), horn bell Muse, French for reed pipes such as the pibole, gaita gastore. Related to musette (bagpipe) See also shephard's horn (below)		Modern alboka. This one was constructed in the Basque region of Spain or Southern France. above: Gaita gastore; below: Gaitas serranas. Drawings of tubular single reeds in which the reed is still part of the reed stem.	1280 A.D., folio 304v from the Musician's Codex, Cantigas de Santa Maria. Depiction of alboka (left) and reedpipe. Pibole, from a frescoe in the church of Vieux Pouzauges, circa 1220 AD Illustration of simple hornpipe, a cowhorn with a single reed at the tip, where the musician blows. Simple way to get a noise from a horn.
Bagpipes Bellows pipe	See article: List of bagpipes See reedpipes below Reedpipes attached to a leather bag to give a continuous air supply.	baghèt, N. Italy piva zampogna (Calabria, Sicily, Malta) duda, Hungary gaita (Iberian Peninsula) gaita asturiana gaita de boto galician gaita gaita transmontana gaita cabreiresa odrecillo, small bagpipe (Old Spanish) sac de gemecs, Catalonia gajda, Balkans kaba gaida (Bulgaria) gaida (Macedonia) cimpoi (Romania) tsampouna (Greece) askomandoura (Greece) great Highland bagpipe, Scotland Northumbrian smallpipes (England) pipa cŵd (Wales) uilleann pipes (Ireland) huemmelchen, Germany musette, France musa, Latin, moúsa, Greek Binioù (Brittany) säckpipa, Sweden torupill, Estonia xeremia, Mallorca żaqq, Malta	Circa 1100 A.D., Italy. One of the earliest known bagpipe images. Psalter of Polirone 1400s, England. Miniature illustration of Robin the Miller, with a 16th-century note "Robin with the Bagpype" from folio 34v of the Ellesmere Manuscript of Chaucer's Canterbury Tales. England, circa 1320-1340 A.D. Man playing bagpipes, Luttrell Psalter MS 42130, folio 176.	1280 A.D., Spain. Bagpipes in the Cantigas de Santa Maria, Musician's Codex 1280 A.D., Spain. Bagpipes in the Cantigas de Santa Maria, Musician's Codex, folio 330. 1280 A.D., Spain. Bagpipes in the Cantigas de Santa Maria, Musician's Codex. Askomandoura or tsamboura chanters. Mandoura is also the name of a simple mouth-blown reedpipe.
Bladder pipe	See reedpipes below Reedpipes in which the player blows into a bag made from a bladder; by puffing their cheeks (to continue air pressure while taking a breath) players could keep a continual air flow going to the reeds.		1280 A.D., Spain. Bladder pipes in the Cantigas de Santa Maria, Musician's Codex, folio 209R. 14th century, Karlštejn Castle. Angle with bladder pipe.	1280 A.D., Spain. Bladder pipes in the Cantigas de Santa Maria, Musician's Codex, folio 277R. Circa 1875. Bladder pipe, double reed, wood, leather, pig's bladder.
Buisine Anafil Nafir Trompe	See horn and wooden trumpet below. The nafir was a Muslim instrument, adapted by Europeans and renamed the anafil in Spain and the buisine in France.ú ú The buisine (first mention about 1100 A.D.) was a long, slightly curved horn, used in battle for signaling. It was replaced by the nafir, the name transferred to the new instrument. The new buisine was of brass, copper or silver, 4–7 feet long, made in sections that could be assembled with "bosses" covering the joints. In 12th century trompe in French (also Catalan, Spanish and Portuguese variants) is recorded for an instrument that is "long and straight." Used in battles as a signal horn, in tournaments and weddings for atmosphere. By the 17th century the trompe had a single coil. Europeans developed the instrument further into the herald trumpet or clarion near the end of the medieval period.	Initially in Spain (during the Reconquista), and France and other parts of Europe during the Crusades.	Circa 800-850 A.D., Carolingian Empire, Stuttgarter Psalter. Before applying to Saracen instruments, buisine applied to long horns and trumpets. Circa 850 A.D., Utrecht Psalter, France/Germany. Wooden trumpets drawn by Anglo-Saxon artists. 1000 A.D. Angels blowing horns for the Apocalypse. Europeans in this era depicted horns as the instruments of war.	1237, Arabia. Muslim soldiers blowing Nafirs or buqs (warhorns). The Christian world adapted the long trumpets, using them in war and painting them into the hands of angels. 1330, France. Angels with buisines; an angel blows the first trumpet of the Apocalypse. 1280 A.D., Spain. Anafils in the Cantigas de Santa Maria. 1450-1460, France. Man on horseback playing buisine. From the Cloisters Apocalypse.
Clarion Claretta Fanfare trumpet Herald trumpet Bugle	Clarion today implies high, angelic, pealing notes. That sound was developed, however, as Europeans began to learn to shape and bend sheet-metal tubes for trumpets. Muslims also had trumpets with clarion notes, as part of a mix of trumpet sounds with tenor and bass. Horns would change too, becoming metal instruments such as the bugle (Old English word for ox). Clarion eventually became a range of notes, within the reach of natural trumpets and bugles. The later medieval and Renaissance cornetts (fingerhole horns) would also come to hit clarion notes.		Grotesque playing a bent-tube trumpet. 1405 A.D. Grotesque playing an S-curve trumpet. Europeans began to transform the long buisine into shorter trumpets that were easier to handle. Circa 1302-1310, Italy. Angels heralding the Last Judgment with trumpets. This artwork once flanked a relief of Christ as Judge. The notes would have been piecing, as shorter trumpets hit higher notes.	Circa 1412, France. Clarion trumpet, buisine trumpet, 2 shawms 1511, England. Heralds, including John Blanke, with clarions or herald trumpets. Fra Angelico - Angel holding a Trumpet detail from the Linaivoli Triptych Germany 16th century. In the Renaissance the clarion or claretta (in Germany) would be fully developed, as in this wood engraving.
Cornett "Proto-cornetts" Fingerhole trumpets Fingerhole horns	See horn, shepherd's horn and wooden trumpet below Best known as a Renaissance instrument (1500s-1600s), cornetts were wooden fingerhole trumpets whose blowhole was so small it required the instrument be played at the side of the mouth. The cornett was likely derived from an animal horn pierced with fingerholes such as the coradoiz. Later cornetts took on a stylized appearance, the curved instruments somewhat resembling an animal horn. Carved wooden instruments had octagon exterior by the 12th century. In artwork, it may be difficult to know whether an instrument is lip-blown (a trumpet) or a reedpipe (sounded by a reed inserted into the tip, held in the player's mouth).		Shepherd's horn with fingerholes, carved from wood. Russia. Ganu rags (Latvian) 1275-1300 A.D. Man on stilts playing early cornett or fingerhole trumpet, from the British Museum, Royal 14 B V, Membrane 1 1448, Germany. Die 24 Alten (The 24 Elders), Coburg State Library, Ms Cas 43	1050-1100 A.D., Germany. Ethan playing a proto-cornett, Pommersfeld Bible, Gräfl ich Schönbornsche Bibliothek, 334, fol. II 148 11th century A.D., Winchcombe Psalter. Proto-cornett or fingerhole horn. 1025-1075 A.D., Germany. Trumpeter with cowhorn and proto-cornett (right), and bell-chimes (left).
Crumhorn	See reedpipes below A Renaissance/Baroque instrument, the sound mechanism was a bundle of reeds beneath a wooden cap. The musician blew through the cap. The instrument likely descended from the medieval bladder pipe.	krumnhorn, Germany cromorne, tournebout, France	The reed bundle Modern recreations of crumhorns	1510, Italy. Angel with crumhorn, detail of Presentation of Jesus in the Temple by Vittore Carpaccio (1465–1526)
Flageolet	Originally a "whistle flute" or duct flute from Asia. Used in medieval Europe by the 11th century A.D. In Europe it was a flute of the countryside, made of willow (see willow flute below) as late as the mid-13th century. It was also made of cane or wood (and in one example, copper) with a fipple at the top, which musicians blew through to produce sound. Later version in 1581 would have 4 fingerholes and 2 thumbholes. It was characterized in 1640 as being shorter than the recorder. One possible version of the instrument was a short four-holed duct flute (Russpfeif), illustrated in 1511 by Virdung. The flaviol was a flageolet of the Pyrenees, about 6 inches long with one fingerhole and played with one hand with the drum or tabor. Some flaviols may have 3 fingerholes and two vents, one thumbhole and two vents. Another, played one-handed with tabor, had a single fingerhole.	flageol, French until 13th century flageolet, French from 13th century forward flaviol, Catalonian, Provincial	1511, Germany. Russpfeif, from Musica getutscht und außgezogen by Sebastian Virdung.	Modern flabiol from Catalan showing the top with three fingerholes and 2 vents and the bottom with one fingerhole and two vents.
Fife and drum	The fife is a small transverse flute with 6 fingerholes. Introduced widely to Europe as soldier's instruments during 15th century by Swiss mercenaries. Seen in France in 1507 and England in 1510.	French fifre German Querpfeife Schweizerpfeife (Swiss fife) Italian fifjaro Spanish pífano		1493, Nuremberg, Germany. Two musicians with short flute (fife?) and drum play before dancers).
Flute	Flutes in medieval Europe included the transverse flute and the duct flute. The transverse flute was held horizontally below the musician's head, allowing them to blow air into the top side of the instrument (across the hole's sharp edge). Flutes had been known in Europe in prehistoric times but disappeared. The transverse flute had also been seen in Europe as early as the 2nd century B.C. (recorded in Etruscan artwork from a tomb in Perugia). It also made an appearance on a coin from Syria, circa 169 A.D. These are the only early examples currently known. The transverse flute which arrived in medieval Europe developed in Asia, where separate traditions existed in India and China. It entered Europe through Byzantium (by way of "North Africa, Hungary, and Bohemia") and Germany. Curt Sachs saw examples of it in Greek art as early as the 10th century, and said it had been written about "as plágioi about 800 A.D." Other researchers note the 11th century as the beginning of depictions in European artwork. Transverse flutes became popular in Germany and were known as German flutes as the instruments' use spread. In the early 20th century, it was noted that the countries of Romania, Yugoslavia, Hungary, Bohemia, Austria and Switzerland held a "predilection" for the transverse flute in the folk music.	side blown flute cross flute German flute (English) Swegel (German) flauta alemana (Spanish) flauste d'Allemand (French) flauste traversaine (French)	1066, Byzantine Empire. David playing flute, Theodore Psalter. 11th century A.D., Göreme, Turkey. From a Byzantine church (Karanlık Kilise), a fresco of a boy holding a transverse flute.	1280 A.D., Spain. Transverse flute in the Cantigas de Santa Maria, Musician's Codex. Circa 1000 A.D., Kyiv, Ukraine. Musician with transverse flute, part of group of musicians and acrobats.
Duct flute fipple flute	Duct flute with tapering bore, seen in French art in 11th century A.D., traceable back from modern times into the 12th century. Called the recorde in England by about 1400. In 1400s multiple sizes existed. By 1511, sizes included bass, tenor, alto and soprano instruments. Recorders are fairly rare in medieval art, the pipe (for pipe and tabor) being more common. Possibly began main start in European music in Northern Italy in the 14th century, and was established at the beginning of the 16th century. It is difficult to tell from art if a recorder is presented (with a thumb hole) or a "some kind of folk pipe (without the thumb hole)." In comparison, reed pipes had a very limited range of notes (having only 3-4 holes and being played with one hand). Recorders and pipes with the holes requiring two hands to play had a broader range of notes. Another detail difficult to see is the mechanism of sound; recorders are flutes in which the sound is produced by a fipple. Reed pipes such as aulos used reed bundles like a shawm to produce notes, or single reeds like the zummara. Three and four hole pipes have been excavated in Novgorod, dating to the 11th and 15th centuries A.D. The timeline is not clear for the development into flutes with more holes. It isn't certain whether pipes with 3-4 holes were played alone, with a timbrel or tabor, or in pairs. Double flutes in Eastern Europe date back to the 12th-13th centuries. Used in Russia, Belarus, western Ukraine, Serbia, Bosnia and Croatia.	recorder, English, late 14th century flûte à bec, French Blockflöte, German flauto dritto, Italian flauta de pico, Spanish Svirel dudka dudka-dvoychatka sopel solpilka pyzhatka	Sopel from Novgarod From the left dudka, dudka dvoychatka (a pair), and pyzhatka (all can be categorized svirel, flutes)	Circa 1315 A.D., Macedonia. Possibly a recorder. Otherwise a folk pipe or reed pipe. Solpilka double flute Dvojnice double flute from former Yugoslavia.
Double flutes Double recorder	See: tabor pipe, below Uses a fipple (hole to blow through, combined with sound producing hole) as on a recorder. Similar to double reedpipes, in that each flute was played with one hand. Some were three hole flutes. Other flutes existed with more holes, still played with one hand, including the Flabiol.		1469-1470, Italy. Double flute player, detail from Francesco del Cossa's fresco "Allegory of April, Triumph of Venus". 1534-1536, Italy. Double fipple flute played side-by-side, detail from a painting The Concert of Angels by Gaudenzio Ferrari. Appears to be three-hole pipes.	Circa 1312-1317 A.D., Italy. Double flutes and a gittern. The flutes are played like the flabiol, with the pinky finger possibly pressing on holes from the underside and supporting the instrument. 1534-1536, Italy. Double fipple flutes, three-hole pipes. Circa 1474, Italy. Double flute, each with full set of fingerholes. From Matteo di Giovanni, Assunzione Della Vergine.
Gemshorn	A recorder made from horn. It was originally made from chamois horn, but in later music, the an ox-horn version filled the gap between the flageolet and the recorder. It became common to use ox horn after 1375 A.D. The instrument's popularity in the 15th century led to an organ stop being created by 1511 with the name gemshorn or cor de chamois. It was illustrated by Virdung in 1511, and Agricola in 1528, but may have been in decline in the 16th century. The mouthpiece of the instrument is at the top of the wide end of the horn; the large hole has been filled in with a blowing hole left at the top, creating a fipple. A sound hole to create the sound is cut into the sidewall of the horn, along with fingerholes. Artwork showing the instrument shows three or four fingerholes on the top. Three fingerholes and a thumb hole will play an octave. Modern builders have added soundholes.	Scottish-English gait horn (goat horn) French cor de chamois, flûte en corne German Gams or Gems (for chamois) + horn Italian Corno di camoscio Spanish gemscorno	1500-1700 A.D., Germany. Gemshorn with 6 finger holes. Fits description of instrument examined by Sachs, a six holed instrument with a vent in the tip, about 13 inches long.	Gemshorn in 1511 book, Musica Getutscht, by Sebastian Virdung. Three fingerholes with "dorsal thumbhole". Modern gemshorn.
Horn Bockhorn or Bukkehorn Blowing horn Hunting horn Signal horn Battle horn Olifant Swedish cowhorn Shofar War horn	Trumpets made from cattle horns (the name bugle from Latin, for buculus or bullock), from other materials and shaped like cattle horns, and other animal horns such as goats (bukkehorn) or sheep (shofar). Carved ivory horns of this style were called oliphants. Words in English: cowhorn, bullhorn, oxhorn, steerhorn. Horn in English was used in Old English as well; in Beowulf a leader calls his men to battle with a horn. Among peaceful uses of these horns was for farmers to call to their cattle herds to bring them in. Could be drilled with as many as three or four fingerholes. Bockhorns have been found with fingerholes as far back as the Iron Age.	Old English: horn used in Beowulf Norway/Sweden vallhorn, tuthorn, tjuthorn, björnhorn fingerhole version låthhorn, spelhorn, prillarhorn	1066-1883 A.D., Normandy. Hunter blowing horn, from the Bayeux Tapestry 11th century A.D., Italy. Olifant, ivory hunting horn. Bockhorn made from goat's horn, traditional to Norway and Sweden. Could also be made of ram's horn or cow horn. Man playing a shofar in Ukraine.	Circa 1910, Nörstmo Halvar Halvarson, a Swedish man, playing a kohorn (cowhorn). Placing the hand over the end gives some pitch control. Günter Sommer, German man playing a cowhorn. His horn has a mouthpiece, giving him more control of pitch. Basque blowing a horn.
Olifant	Hunting or war horns carved from ivory		Oliphant displayed as belonging to Roland, (died 778 A.D., hero of the French epic Chanson de Roland).	Ivory olifant hunting horn
Medieval trumpet Iberian trumpet	See shepherd's horn and wooden trumpet below		Circa 1255 A.D., England or France. Apocalypse Picture Book. The top trumpets have texture like birch trumpets. They have fingerholes and narrow mouthpieces and could be cornetts. Picture with a variety of medieval, Renaissance and modern trumpets. The black trumpet from Slovakia (center) is a wood trumpet (two halves carved and glued together), apparently covered with bark like a birch trumpet.	Modern re-creation of Iberian style trumpet, in brass. 1000-1050 A.D., Harley Psalter, England. From the left a fingerhole horn/trumpet, harp, fingerhole horn/trumpet, lute. Harley Psalter; art copied or inspired from earlier Utrecht Psalter.
Organ Pipe organ	Organs invented in antiquity, but not common in Europe. Under reigns of Pepin the short and Charlemagne, the organ was re-introduced to Europe, starting in about 757 A.D. Theophilus's organ in the 11th century A.D., used bellows activated by body weight. That was refined to make all air from three bellows enter into a common channel. Smaller organs are illustrated that are now called portative organs and positive organs.		850 A.D., Utrecht Psalter.	1050-1100 A.D., Germany. Jeduthun playing rebec. The instrument here was played by pushing and pulling slats to open the pipes. Pommersfeld Bible, Gräflich Schönbornsche Bibliothek, 334, fol. II 148 1260 A.D.
Portative Organ			1401–1500 A.D.	1280 A.D., Spain. Portative organ in the Cantigas de Santa Maria, Musician's Codex, folio 185V 1489, St. Ursula Shrine, Belgium.
Positive organ	A tabletop pipe organ		1484–1500, France. One lady plays the pipe organ, with assistance from another on bellows. The instrument also made it into artwork on the Silk Road near China.	1451 A.D.
Panpipes Panflute	An instrument of shepherds in the late Roman Empire, seen in 3rd century A.D. Christian art. The instrument was widespread, appearing in Chinese art from the Tang dynasty featuring men on the Silk Road.		842–850 A.D., Carolingian Empire. Panpipes in the Benedictine Psalter. Circa 1180 A.D., Spain. Shepherd playing panpipes. This style of panpipe is a solid block of wood with drilled holes for the flute's tubes. Early 12th century, Rheims, France. King David playing harp, accompanied by panpipes, singing (psalms?) and cowhorn.	4th century A.D., Aquileia, Italy. Christian artwork of the Good Shepherd theme with panflutes. Panpipes, circa 1125–1150, from Passionale, pars hiemalis - Cod.bibl.fol.57 number 520-257v Panpipes (right) and pibole (reed pipe with single reed, bone body and horn bell). Circa 1496, Germany. Shepherds playing panpipes, in detail of painting by Albrecht Dürer. Pipers are made individually and assembled into a group.
Pipes	English word for a variety of instruments. Tube of wood, reed or other material through which air is blown. Sound occurs from interaction of air with a sharp edge, notch, a duct, reed or some other form of mouthpiece. In European instruments the name "pipes" includes: duct flutes, recorders and three-hole pipes (or tabor pipes); reedpipes and bagpipes; bladder pipes; organ pipes; panpipes; willow pipes	Word used in English and Old French German Pfeife		
Reedpipe Clarinet Launeddas Mantura Sipsi Zhaleika Zummara	See also alboka, in above in this table. An aerophone in the form of a tube with "vibrating reed" inserted, either at the tip (as in launeddas) or inside the interior (as in a crumhorn or alboka). Reeds such as on the launeddas are single reeds; reeds on the shawm are double reeds. Includes bagpipes and bladder pipes (both with internal reeds). Europeans made pipes out of reeds, splitting a reed to make a single reed. A single 3-hole reed pipe could be used for the pipe and tabor. The Launeddas was a more elaborate reed pipe, with multiple pipes; each might have its own reed or one reed might sound multiple pipes. These are more common in medieval art than the recorder (which has more holes and requires both hands to play). Reed pipe traditions around the world include Asia, Southeast Asia, the Middle East and Africa.		1280 A.D., Spain. Single-reed pipes, held together as a pair, called zummara. Cantigas de Santa Maria, Musician's Codex, folio 350R. Circa 845 A.D., France. Jeduthun was depicted playing the tibia curva, a reedpipe shaped like an Iberian trumpet. No fingerholes visible. Examples of single-reed reedpipes.	1280 A.D., Spain. Reed pipes, possibly a launeddas, in the Cantigas de Santa Maria, Musician's Codex. The illustration shows multiple pipes sounded by a single reed. Double Zhaleika or Zhaleyka reed pipes, Russia and Belorussia. Pipes have a split in the sidewall at the top, going with the grain to create a reed. Sipsi, reedpipe or clarinet of Aegean region of Greece and Turkey. Single-reed tips, these from a launeddas. Splits in the tubes are visible that create the reed. Mantoura, a mouth-blown reedpipe from Crete; other mantouras are attached to bags on bagpipes.
Double reedpipes double clarinet diplica	Reedpipes played in sets, one in each hand. In ancient Greece, the aulos were double reedpipes.		1280 A.D., Spain. Double reedpipes from the Cantigas de Santa Maria, Codex of the musicians. Greece, 460 BC–450 BC. Double-reedpipe tradition predates medieval Europe; ancient Greeks used Aulos.	Set of diplica double reedpipes or clarinets from the Balkans. 1534-1536, Italy. Double reedpipes, incorporated into a bagpipe.
Triple pipes Cumbrian pipes cuisle triple reedpipes			Circa 900 A.D., Clonmacnoise, Ireland. Triple pipes, carved onto the Cross of Scriptures. Launeddas triple-reed pipes	1170 A.D., Scotland. Triple pipes from the Hunterian Psalter. Circa 1255-1260 A.D., England. Triple pipes, detail from Dyson Perrins Apocalypse, Ms. Ludwig III 1 (83.MC.72), fol. 17v
Sackbut	Renaissance instrument, ancestor of the trombone. Medieval variant was clarion or slide trumpet.		Circa 1522–1525, Portugal, African-heritage musicians in Portugal playing shawms and a sackbut.	A forerunner of the sackbut-trombone was the buisine with an s-curve.
Shawm bombard pommer piccolo oboe or musette oboe	See reedpipes above Double-reed instruments. The reed bundle is inserted through a disk (used for breath control, for uninterrupted sound, playing while the musician breathes.) In France, musettes were small oboes until the 16th century, when they became bagpipes. The musette was a small keyless double-reed chalumeau, with a visibly conical bore and a pear-shaped bell.	England (Middle English, from French) schallemelem shalemeyes calmuse France (Old French) chalemel chalemie chalemeaux from: calamus (Latin), from κάλαμος (kálamos, Ancient Greek) bombard (Brittany) pommer German Schalmei Iberian Peninsula Dulzaina or dolçaina xirimita bolin-gozo (Basque) Gaita navarra gralla xaramita xirimita grall de pastor chirimia	Musettes (chirimia?, xirimia?) in the Cantigas de Santa Maria, Musician's Codex, folio 350R. Musettes (chirimia?, xirimia?) and clappers in the Cantigas de Santa Maria, Musician's Codex, folio 330. Circa 845 A.D., France. Clappers and a horn with a very sharp tip to blow through. Possibly could be blown like a cornet or shofar (also have narrow opening), or it could be a reed horn (an oboe with a single reed or shawm/oboe with a double reed).	Musettes (chirimia?, xirimia?) in the Cantigas de Santa Maria, Musician's Codex, folio 276V. 1305-1340, Germany. Shawm with reed bundle visible. From the Codex Manesse. 1474 A.D., Italy. Shawm, cymbals, sackbut (?), from Matteo di giovanni, assunzione della vergine.
Shepherd's horn Näverlur Birch trumpet	Wooden trumpets, conical tube about 4 ft long with mouthpiece; made of separate sections of hollowed out wood, glued together; bound with bark. In Norway [and Sweden] used by shepherds in mountain pasturage to call to livestock, frighten predators and call signals to surrounding communities. Shorter lurs could also be used as megaphones. Horns constructed of strips of birchbark or alder bark rolled into tubes, or into cups to fit onto the end of flutes or reedpipes. Also fingerhole horn carved of wood. A mouthpiece is inserted; they may have reed tongues (making them reed horns, shawms or obes) a trumpet mouthpiece, or a tip to make them into flutes. Holes may be cut into the bark tube as well. Instruments may also be built with a mouthpiece resembling a cup or funnel, in which the player uses his lips to create the sound.	Sweden, Russia, Karelia, Belarus, Ukraine, former Yugoslavia Pastusheskiy rog (Пастушеский рог) kugikly (кугиклы) dudki (дудки) manki (манки) Old Norse lúðr Norwegian Lur Neverlur (willow bark trumpet) Alderlur (alder bark trumpet) tåger (grass trumpet) Langlur (long trumpet) Galdrelur (shorter lur)	Birch bark reed horn with double reeds visible. Belgorod region, Russia. Reed horn (a toy?) made for a holiday celebration; double reeds that vibrate when blown are inserted at the narrow end. Birchbark trumpet or näverlur.	1930, Sweden. Young woman playing a birch trumpet. Horns constructed by shepherds in Karelia. Part of culture of Karelians. Some of these have been built with fingerholes.
Clay trumpet	Horns of clay			12th–13th century, Valencia. Horn made from clay.
Tabor Pipe Three-hole pipe Galoubet	A duct flute with three-holes (or two holes and a thumbhole), with a body of wood or reed. Played with other instruments such as the tabor, tambourin à cordes, handbell, or with a second pipe (see double pipes above). Other recorder variants have been used in this manner including the full-sized recorder and the flageolet or flaviol (see above in table).	French Galoubet (from Old Provençal, galaubiar, to play superbly)	One handed pipes suitable for accompanying the tabor.	Circa 1240s. The Morgan Bible, Folio 25. Pipe and bell. Like the tabor pipe, this is played with one hand, while the other hand plays a different instrument. 1320 A.D., Peterborough Psalter (Brussels copy). Pipe and tabor
Willow flute Stabule	These instruments are commonly called willow whistles because they use the bark of a willow tree (the tube created when the center is pulled from inside the bark) to make a whistle. The Russian kalyuka also makes a tube for a whistle, often out of thistle. The two instruments are played the same way, by varying the force of the air blown into the mouthpiece, with the end of the tube being covered by the finger or left open.	Norway Seljefløyte Sweden Sälgflöjt Finland Pitkähuilu Karelia Latvia Stabule Lithuania Švilpynė Romania telincă Russia Kalyuka Ukraine	Norwegian willow whistle (Seljefløyte)	Kalyuka Three willow pipes or stabules of the Polish people from a music exhibition in Warsaw in 1888. Two are cut with fipples, one is cut as a transverse flute.
Wooden trumpet	After the fall of the Roman Empire, trumpets of metal were relatively rare in Europe. Europeans used horns (from goats, sheep and cattle) or carved them from wood. The wooden trumpet was illustrated by Anglo Saxon artists in France in the Utrecht Psalter, circa 850 A.D. They drew long wooden horns with thick metal bands to hold the separate halves of the instrument together. Examples of surviving wooden instruments made in this fashion include the lur found in the Oseberg ship (two hollowed out halves held together with 5 rings or bands) and also the Irish wooden trumpet. In Ireland, a wooden trumpet was found in the Erne River and attributed to the "early Christian Period...8th-10th century." The yew-wood trumpet was carved in two halves lengthwise and bound together with strips of bronze, with a bronze mouthpiece. This Irish trumpet has resembles trumpets illustrated in the Vespasian Psalter. In literature, the instrument was the beme (byme, bemastocc) in Old English. Hygelac (in the late 10th century epic poem Beowulf) calls soldiers to battle with "horn and bȳman". It was the buisine to the French in the epic Chanson de Roland (circa 1100-1120), and the word was used for this instrument until transferred to the later metal instrument in the late 12th century.	Bemastocc (Old-English bem trumpet + stocc wood) Buisine Lúðr (Old Norse)	Utrecht Psalter, 9th century, France. Horns showing signs of assembly (bands around outside) into the shape of cows horns. Musician plays a wooden trumpet in the Tiberius Psalter, circa 1075–1250 A.D. 8th century A.D., England. Wooden trumpets from Vespasian Psalter (Canterbury Psalter, MS Cotton Vespasian A.I, fol. 30v). 9th century A.D., Makuria. St. Michael holding an orb and a trumpet. The trumpet has bands around it. Example of cross-Mediterranean medieval culture, part of Coptic Church in Faras. Some Irish clergy met Coptic ideas when they studied at Lérins Abbey.	Circa 1225 A.D. Horn with bands from Southern portal of the Abbey of Saint-Pierre de Beaulieu, Beaulieu-sur-Dordogne 1280 A.D., Spain. Horns in the Cantigas de Santa Maria. Bands around horn. Horns appear to have mouthpieces; these may be an unknown shawms (with a disk at the mouth, where a reed goes into the mouth), but shawms would have fingerholes. Disk similar to mouthpiece on trumpet from 14th century. Circa 1315, Macedonia. Trumpet, possibly wood. Circa 1235 A.D., France. Horn with bulging section where two shorter sections were merged to make long horn. No bands, unlike the wooden horns. but has bosses like the buisine; possibly represents a metal horn. Early 14th century, Italy. Angels with constructed horns in two joints (indicated by the boss in the center of the instrument).

== Groups of musicians ==
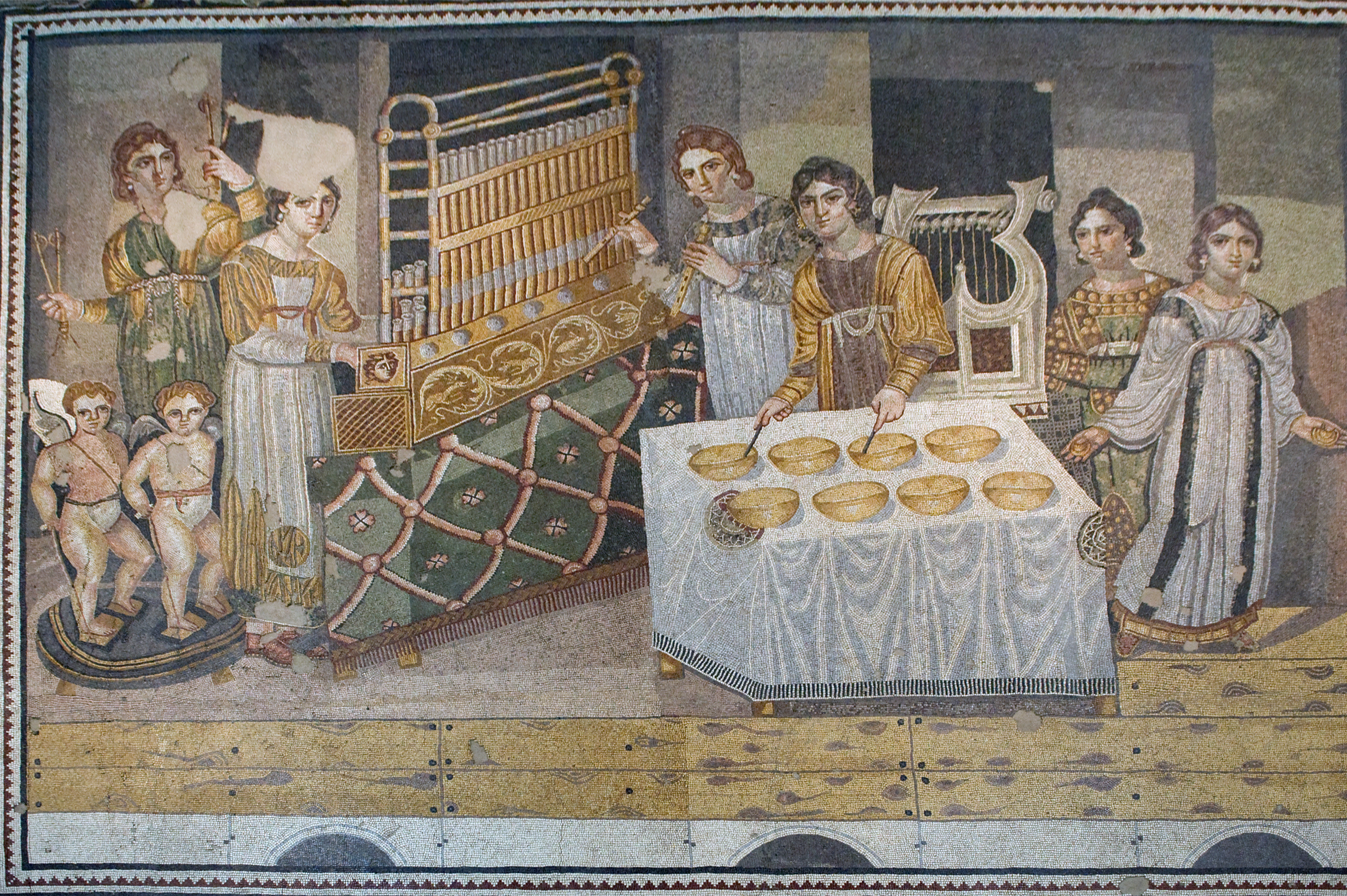
4th century A.D., Mariamin. Instruments of the late Roman Empire, some that would be seen in the Carolingian Empire: crotala (clappers), pipe organ with bellows to power it, double pipes, Oxyvaphi (water-filled metal bowls), kithara, cymbala (castanets).

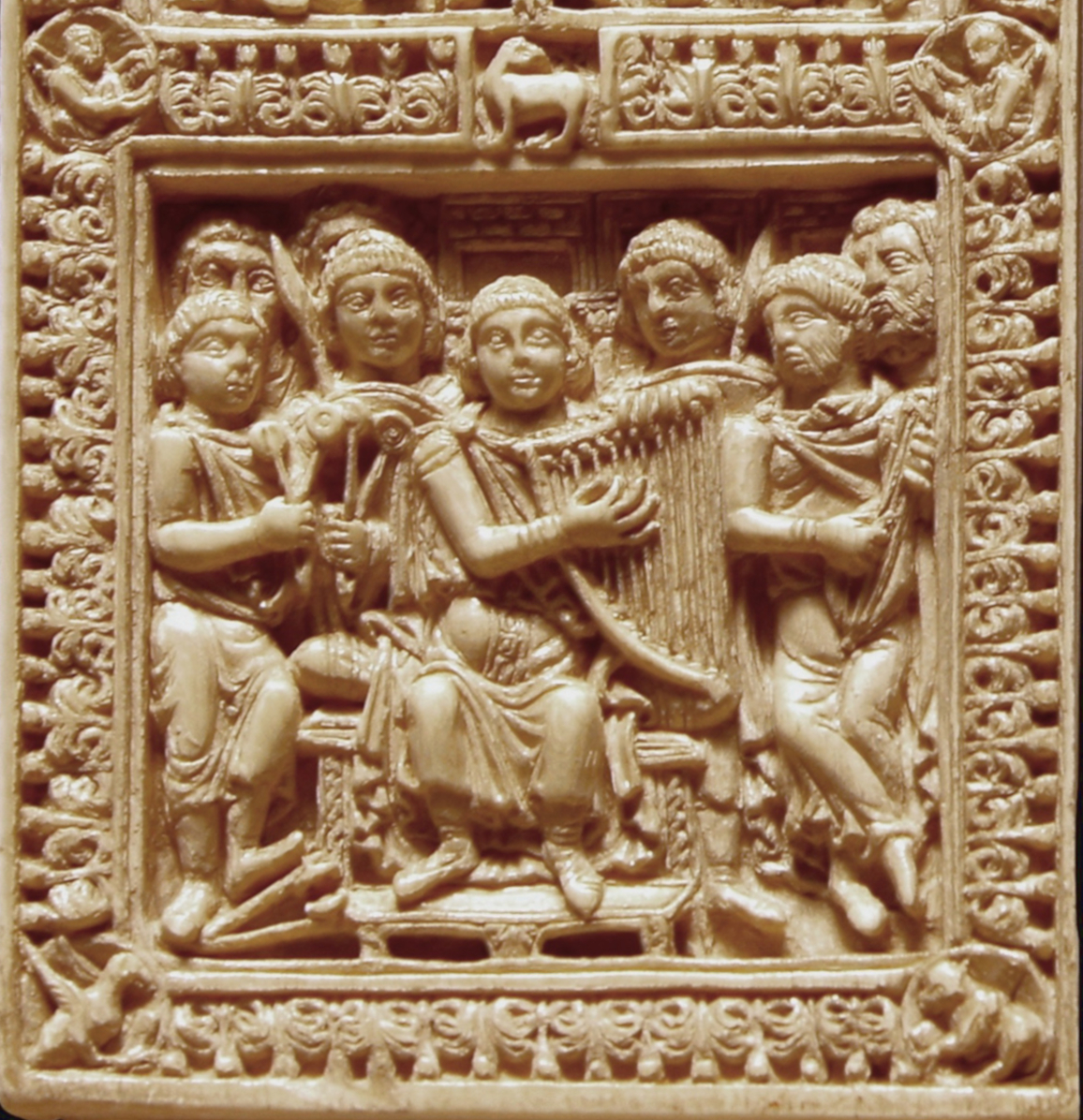
Circa 795 A.D., Carolingian Empire. Probably from Aachen. Crotala (clappers), harp and fiddle.

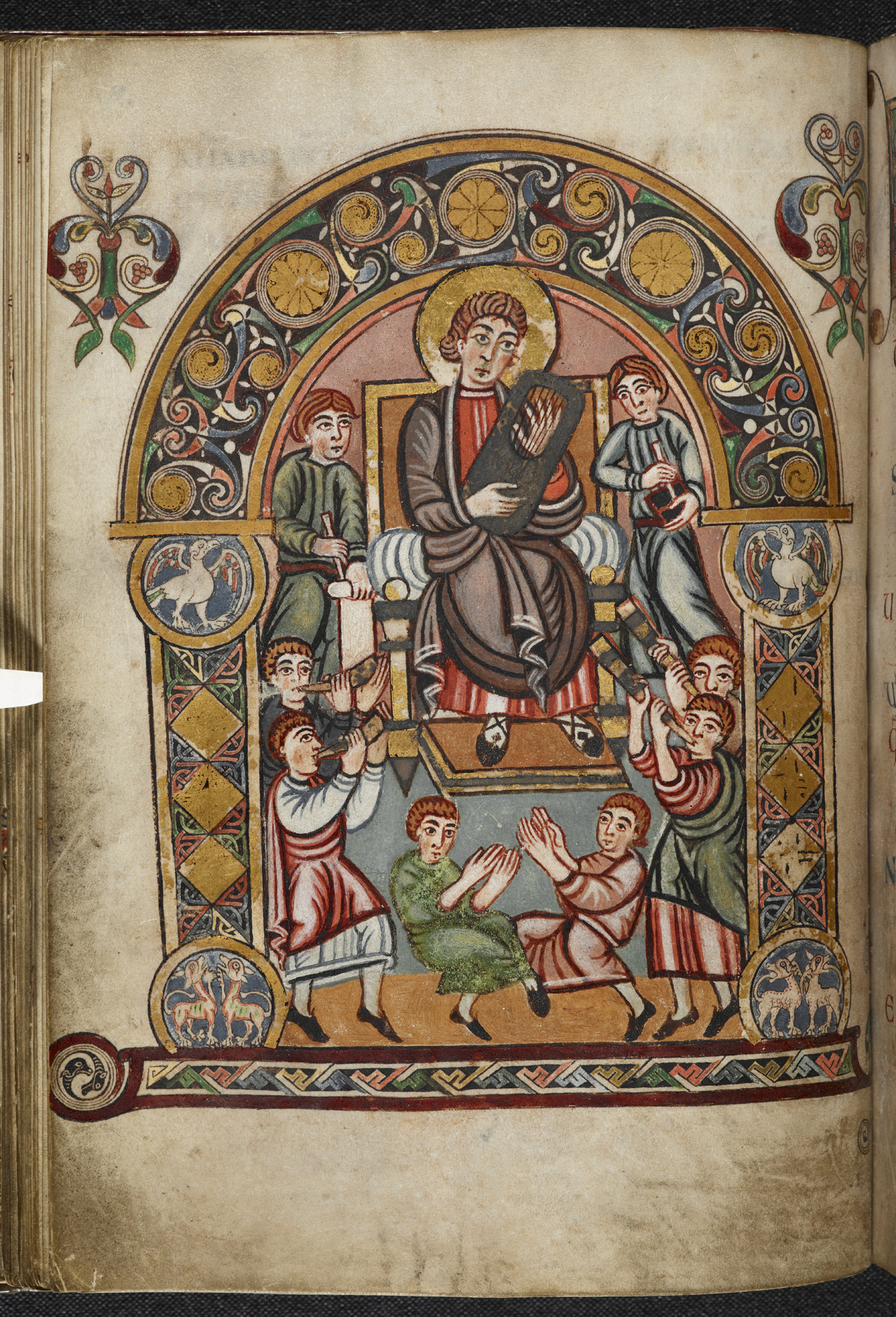
8th century A.D., England. Vespasian Psalter (Canterbury Psalter, MS Cotton Vespasian A.I, fol. 30v). King David playing the lyre with players on wooden trumpets and horns, and gleomen clapping and dancing,

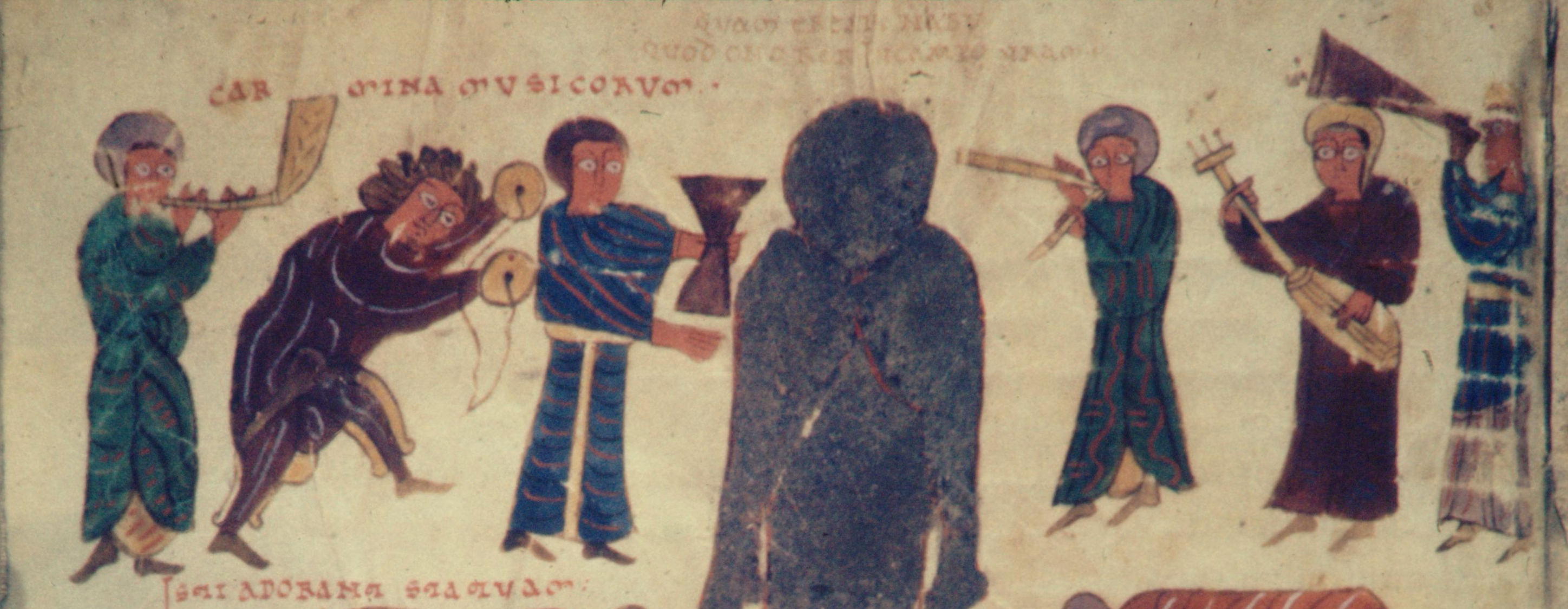
970 A.D. Spain. Medieval band plays for evil being, from the Valcavado Beatus, folio 199v. From left: trumpet or reedpipe (cowhorn attached to reed body), cymbals, hourglass drum, double reedpipes, cythara, wooden trumpet.

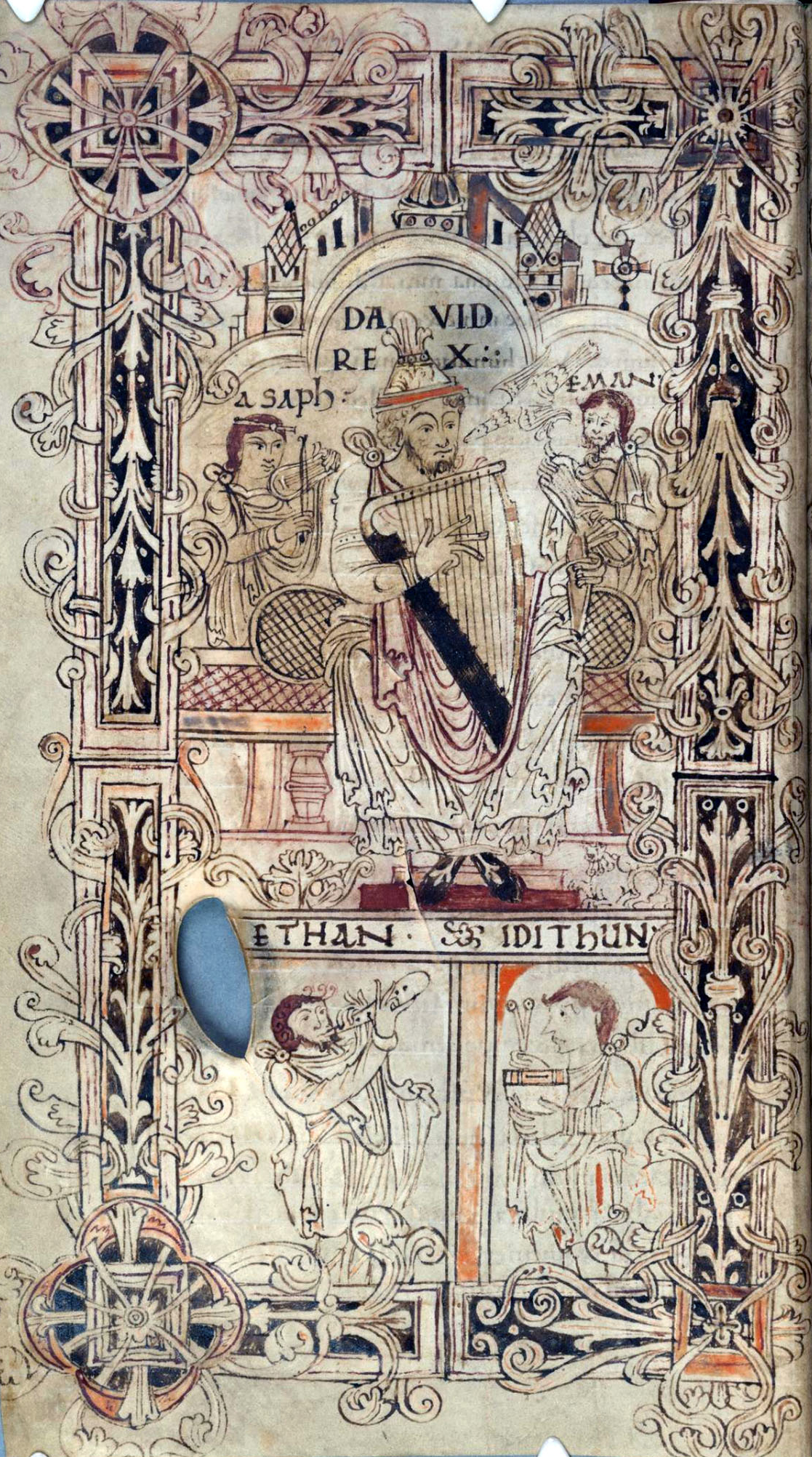
Circa 1025-1050, England, Winchcombe Psalter. King David plays medieval harp surrounded by musicians playing rotte, crwth, cornett (fingerhole horn), and crotals (clappers/cymbals on sticks).

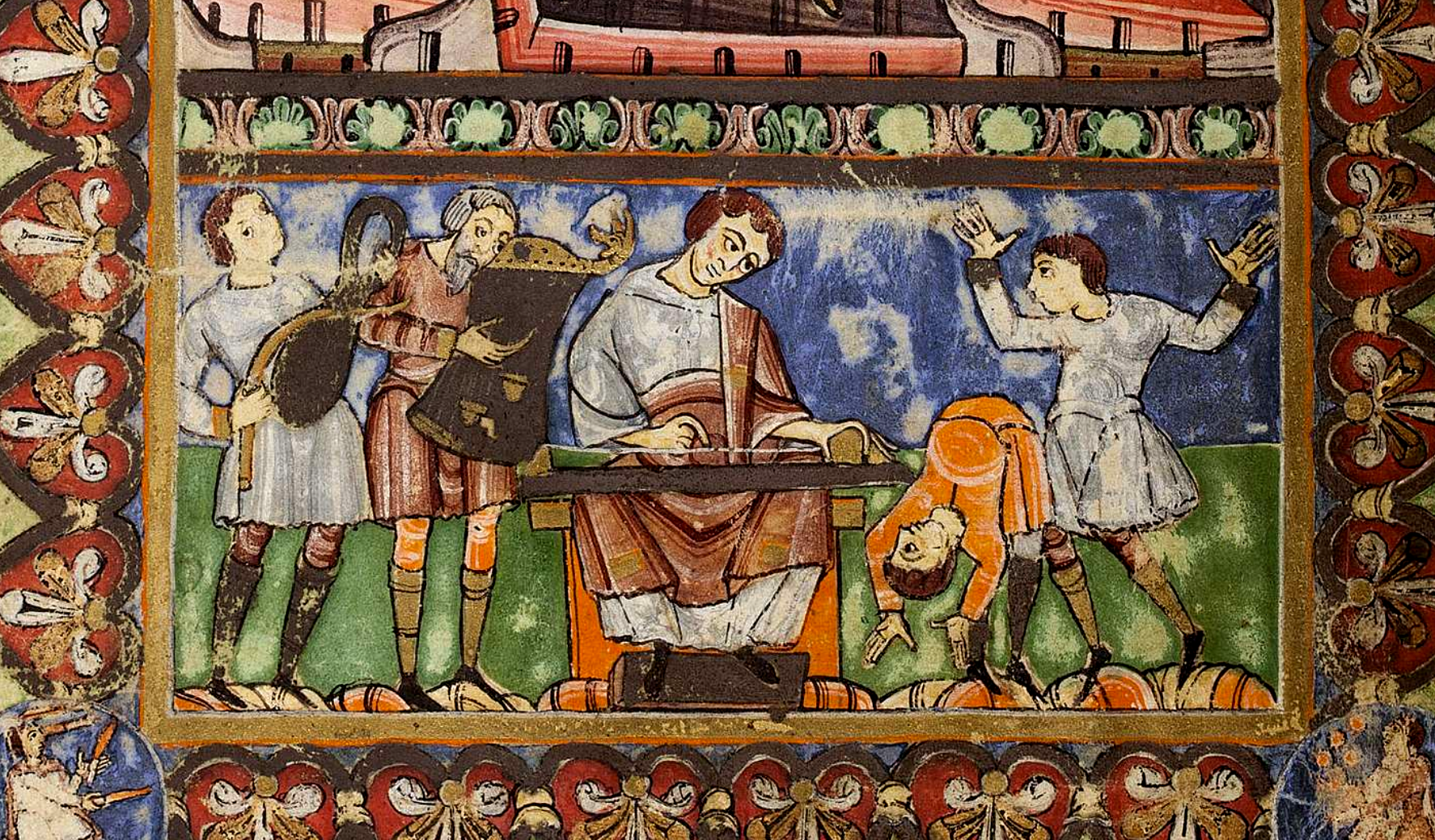
Circa 1029-1050 A.D., Germany. Musicians with bowed lyre, psaltery, monchord, and dancers, from the Psalterium cum Canticis ('Werdener Psalter') Berlin, Staatsbibliothek zu Berlin – Preußischer Kulturbesitz, Ms. theol. lat. fol. 561.

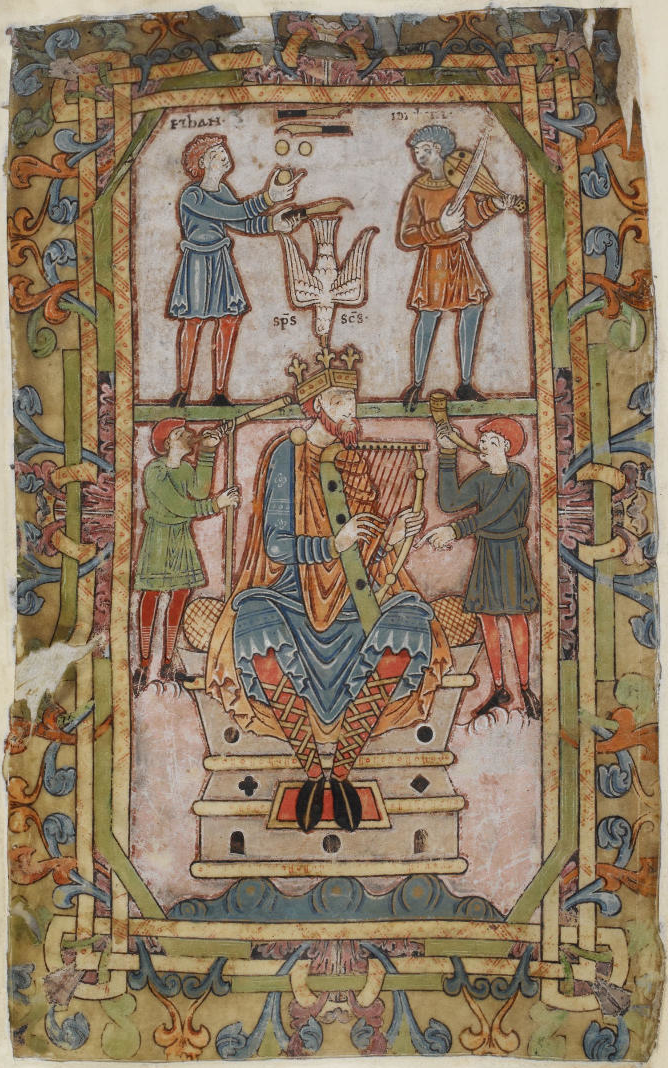
Circa 1075 A.D., England. King Alfred poses as King David. The dove brings the holy spirit; a juggler and a fiddler perform at top; at bottom a wooden trumpet and cowhorn.

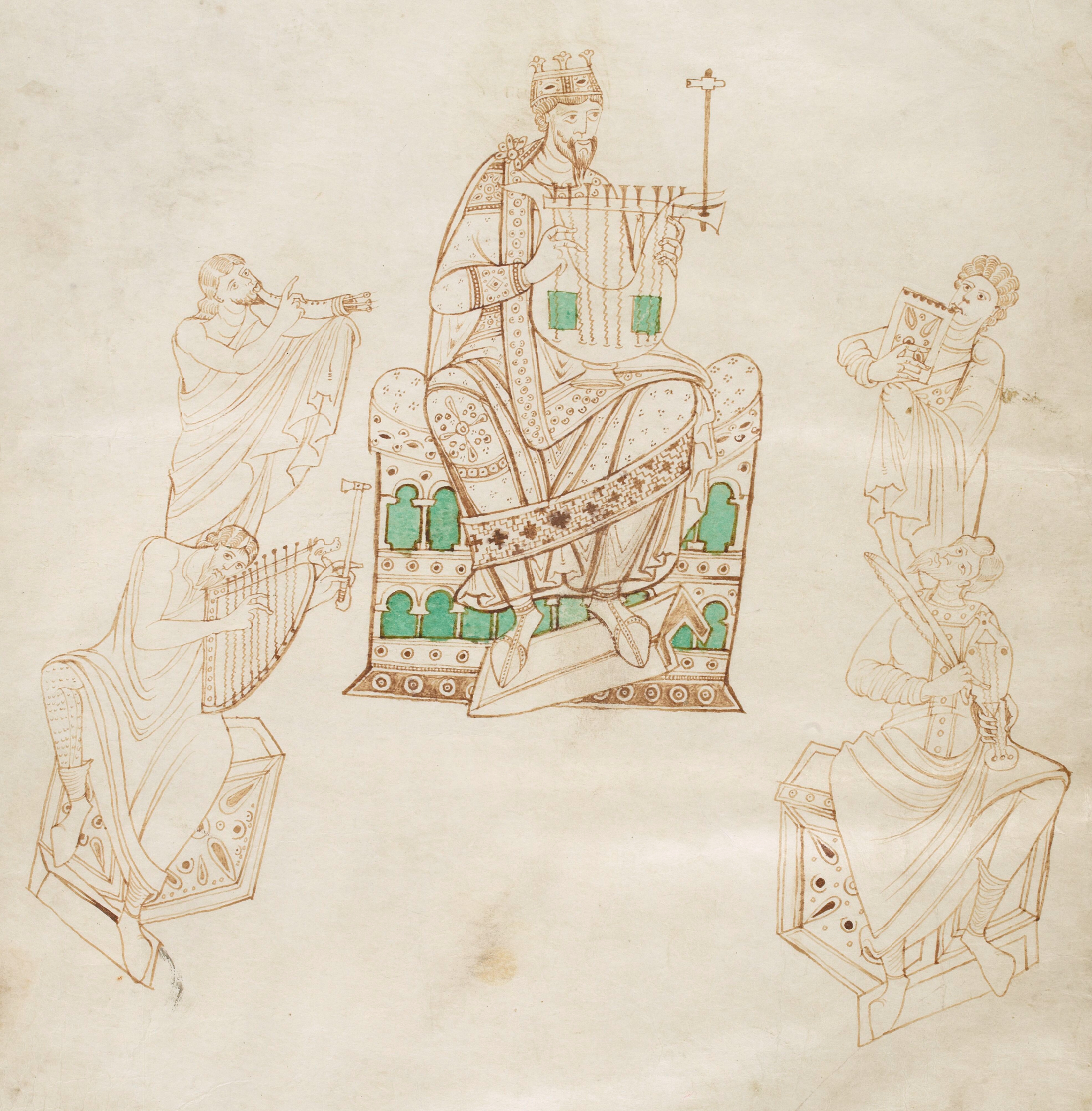
11th century A.D., France David playing lyre with his musicians playing coradoiz, harp, panpipes and rebec.

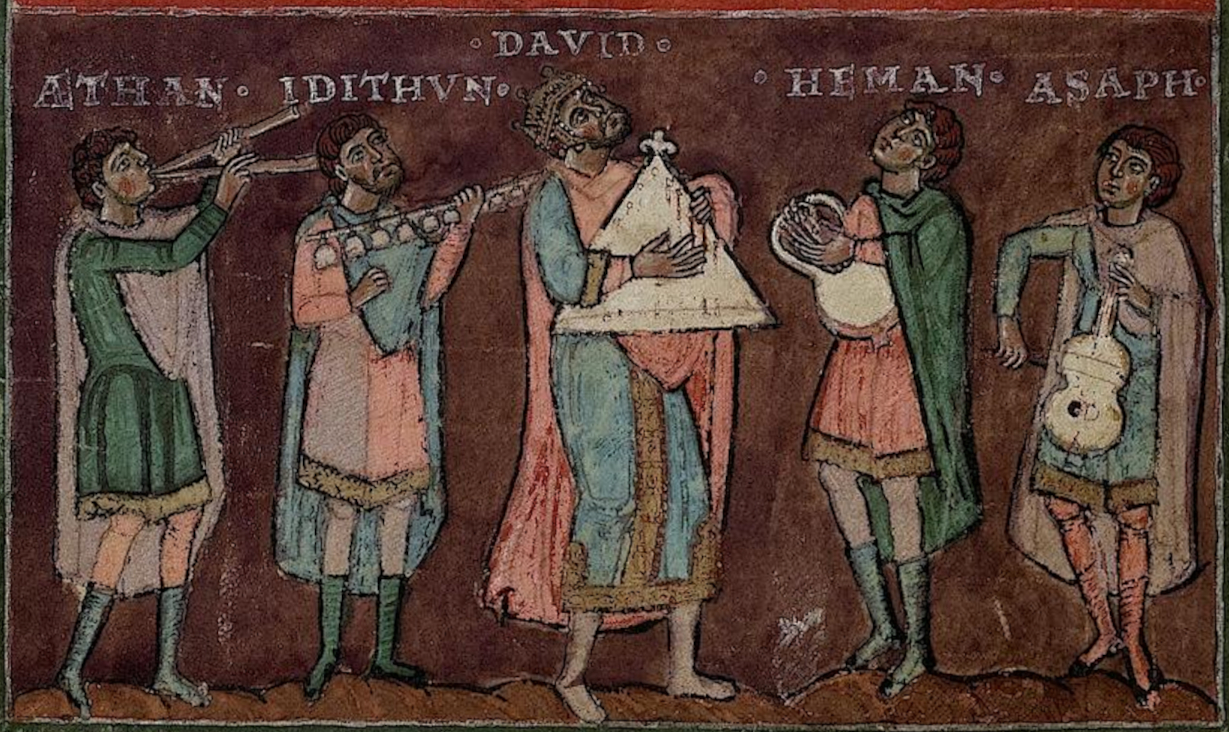
Circa 1050 A.D., Germany. Detail from Heidelberg Psalter. Double pipes, cymbala (bells), psaltery, rotte, viola.

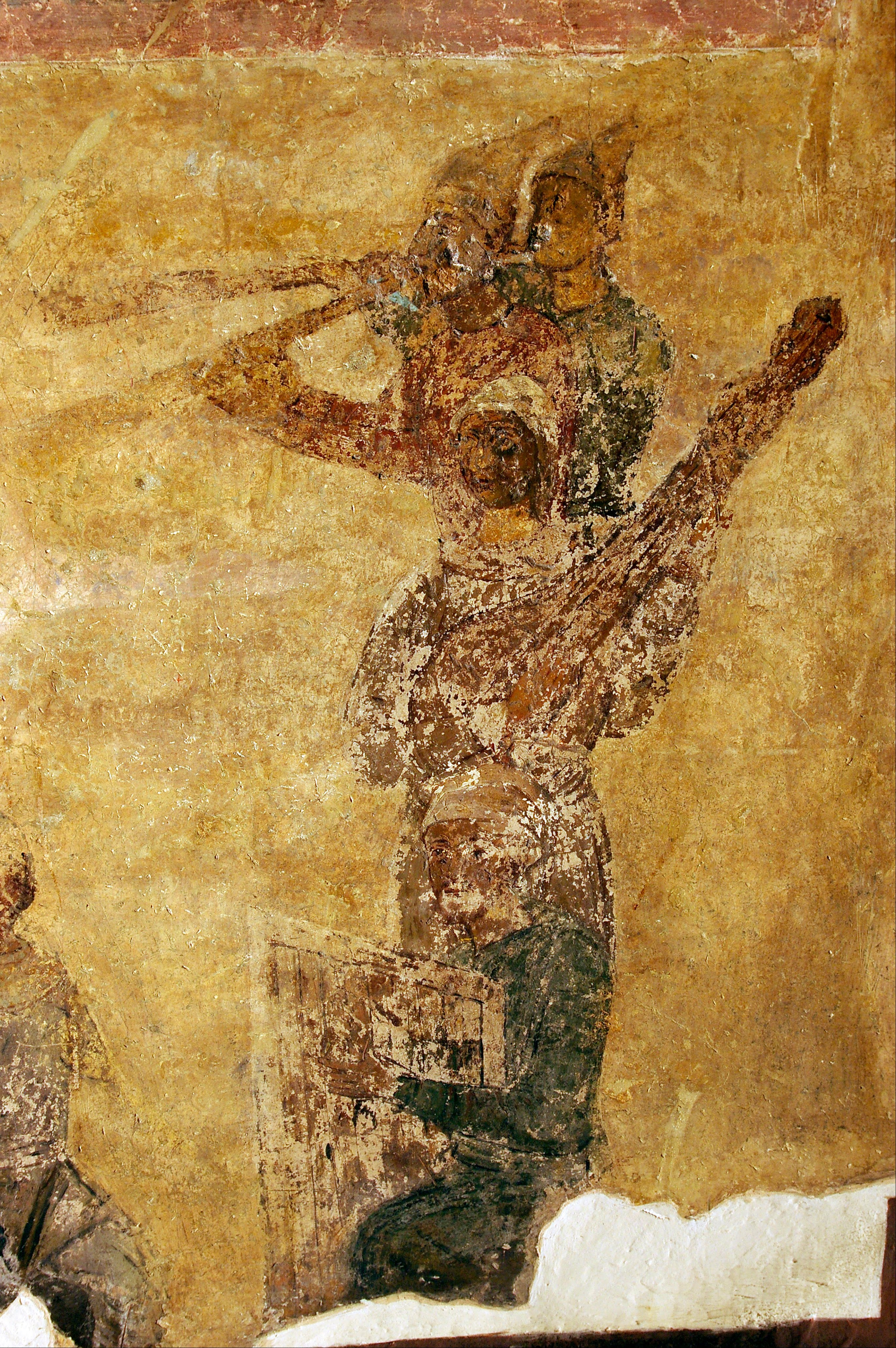
Circa 1000 A.D., Kyiv, Ukraine. Musicians in the Saint Sophia Cathedral with wooden trumpets, a kobza and a psaltery played upright as a harp.

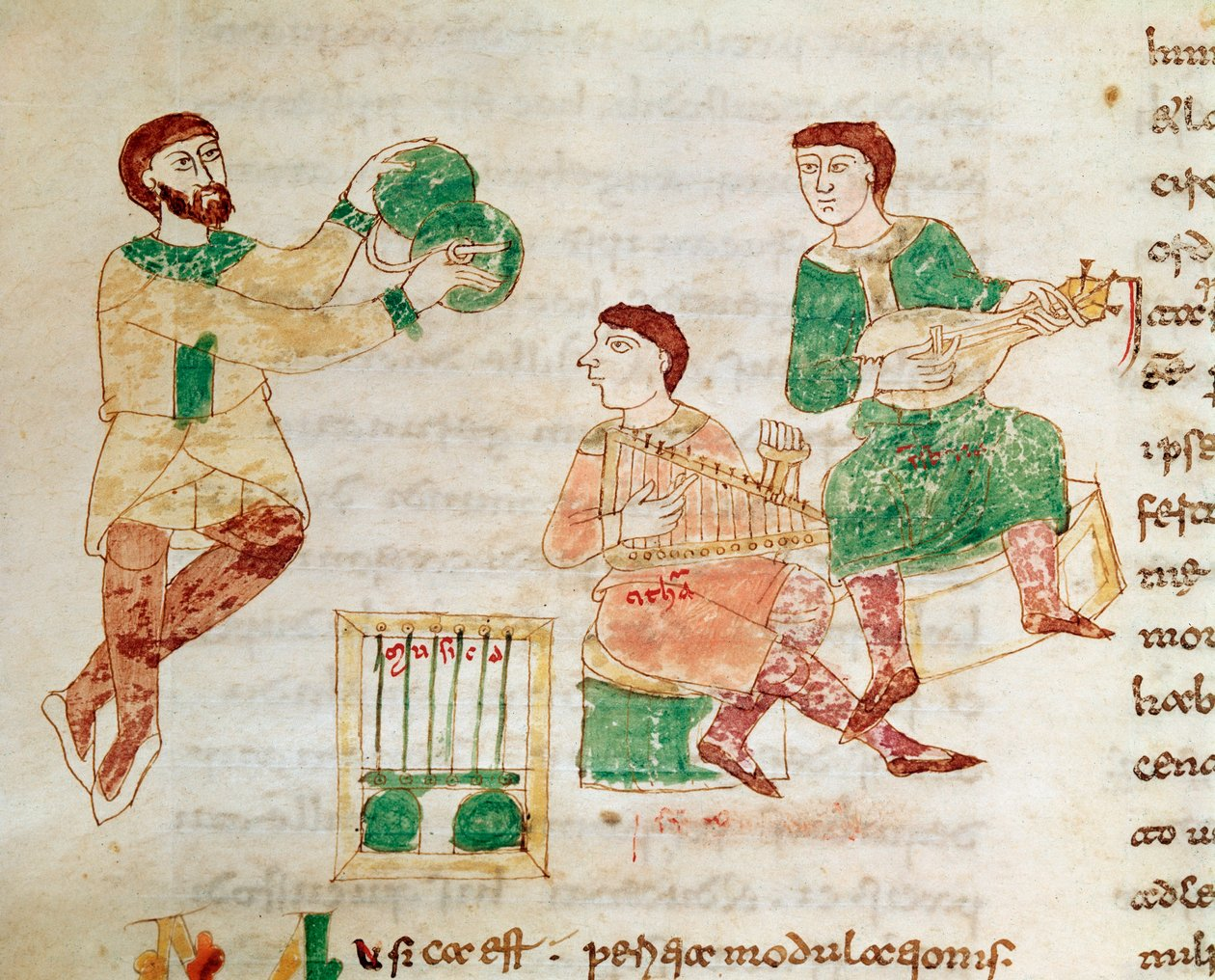
1022-1032, Monte Casino. Musicians from the "De rerum naturis" manuscript, Monte Cassino MS Casin 132; from left cymbals, psaltery, harp or rotte, lute.

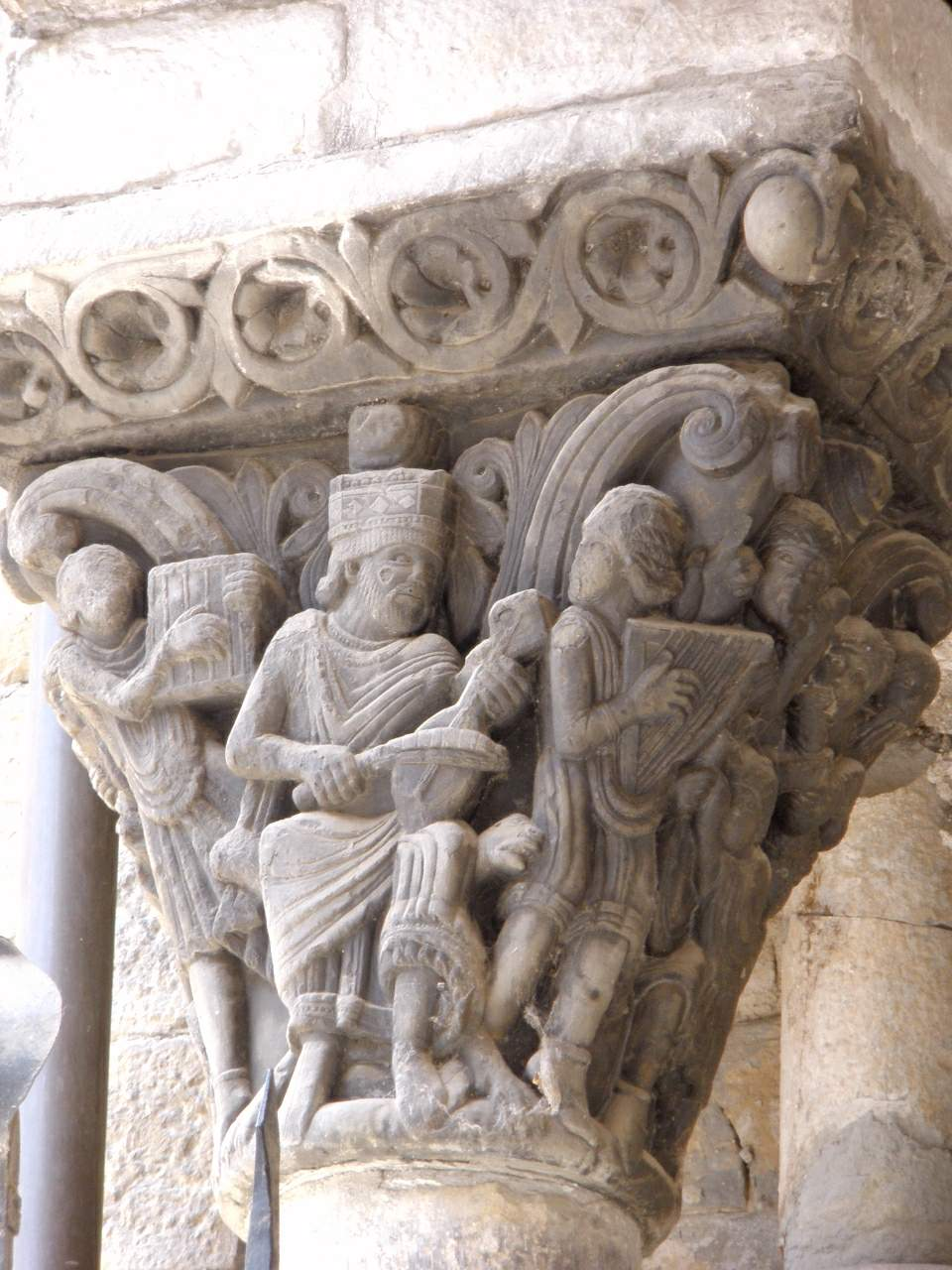
Last third of 11th century, Spain. Three instruments in the Jaca Cathedral Portico; far left the psalterium quadratum; center, David playing the Byzantine lira; right, a musician with a triangular harp (not a rota, because the curved right side is shaped as a harp's forpost). The psalterium quadratum is one of Jerome's instruments; see bumbulum above.

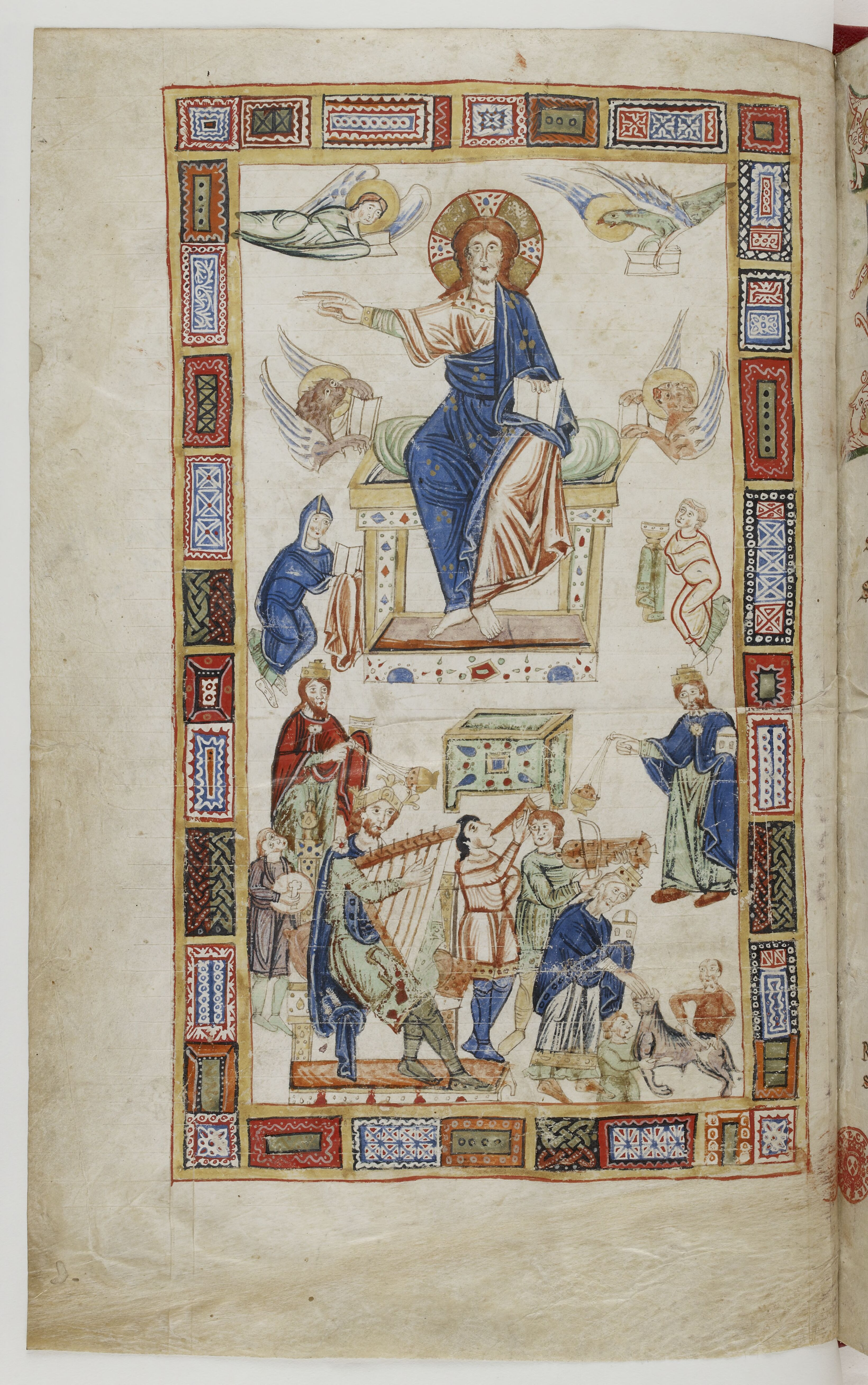
Circa 1125, Italy. Bottom, King David plays rotte; around him are a tabor (frame drum), horn or trumpet, and crwth or fiddle

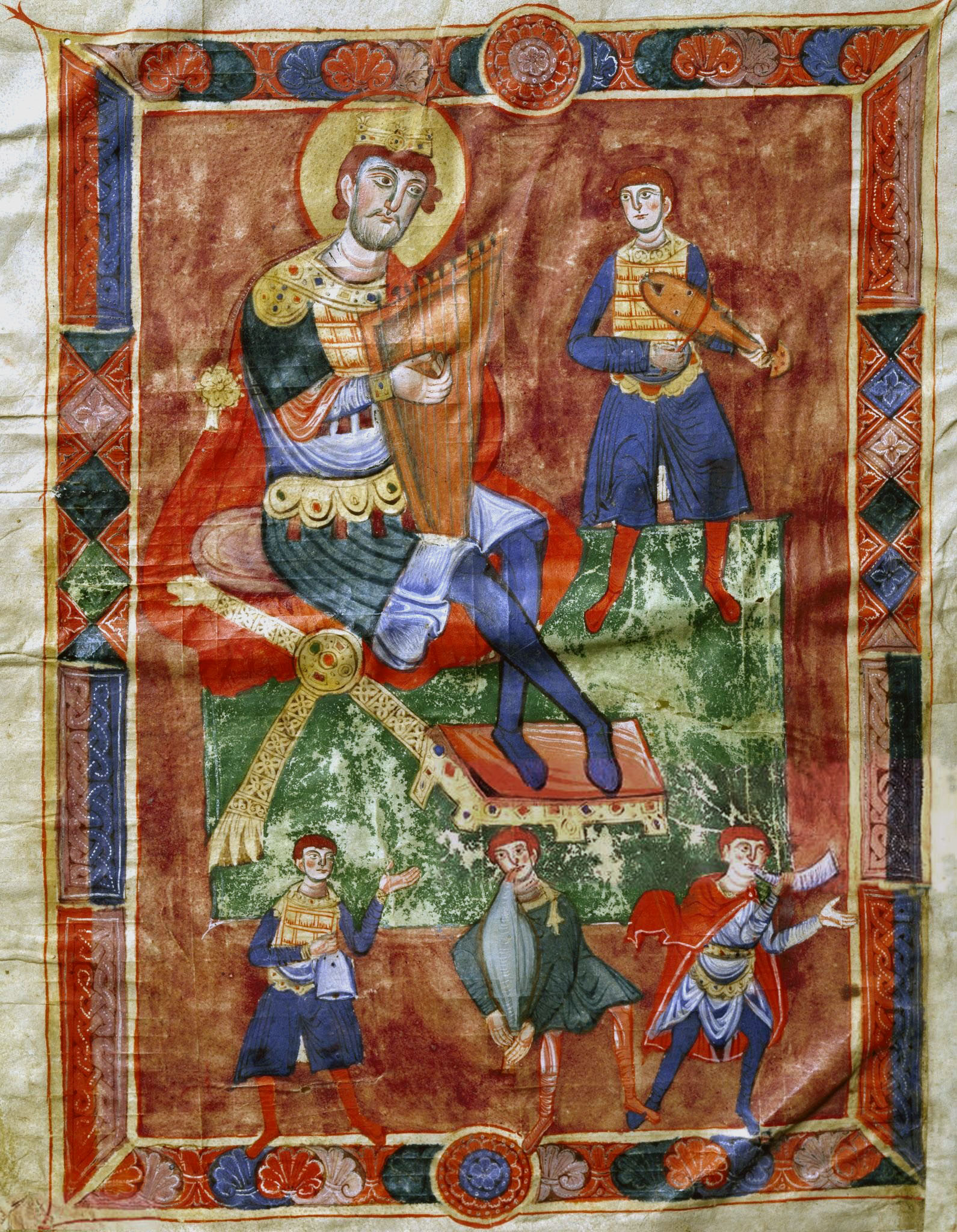
Circa 1100 A.D., Polirone Abbey, San Benedetto Po, Italy. King David playing a rotte (psaltery), with other musicians on fiddle, bell, bagpipe and horn, from the Musicians from the Psalter of Polirone.

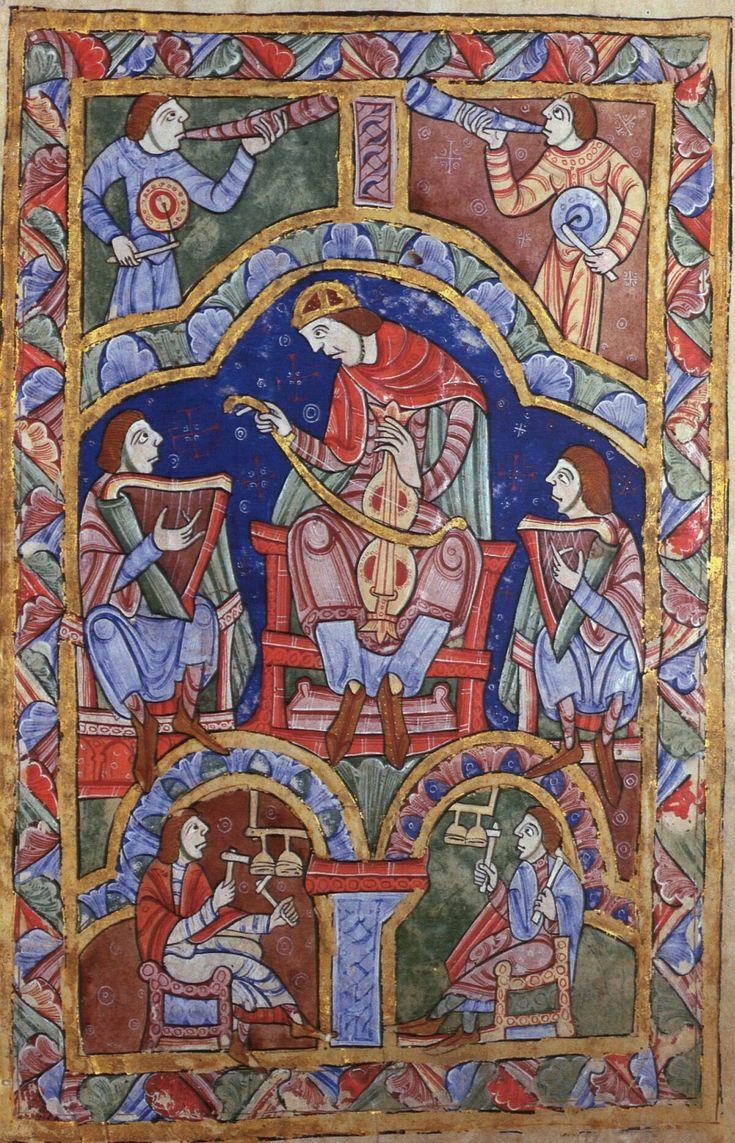
12th century A.D., England. David playing lyra (center), surrounded by (top) musicians with wooden trumpets and nakers, (center) musicians with harps, (bottom) musicians with cymbala (bell chimes), from the Saint Alban's Psalter.

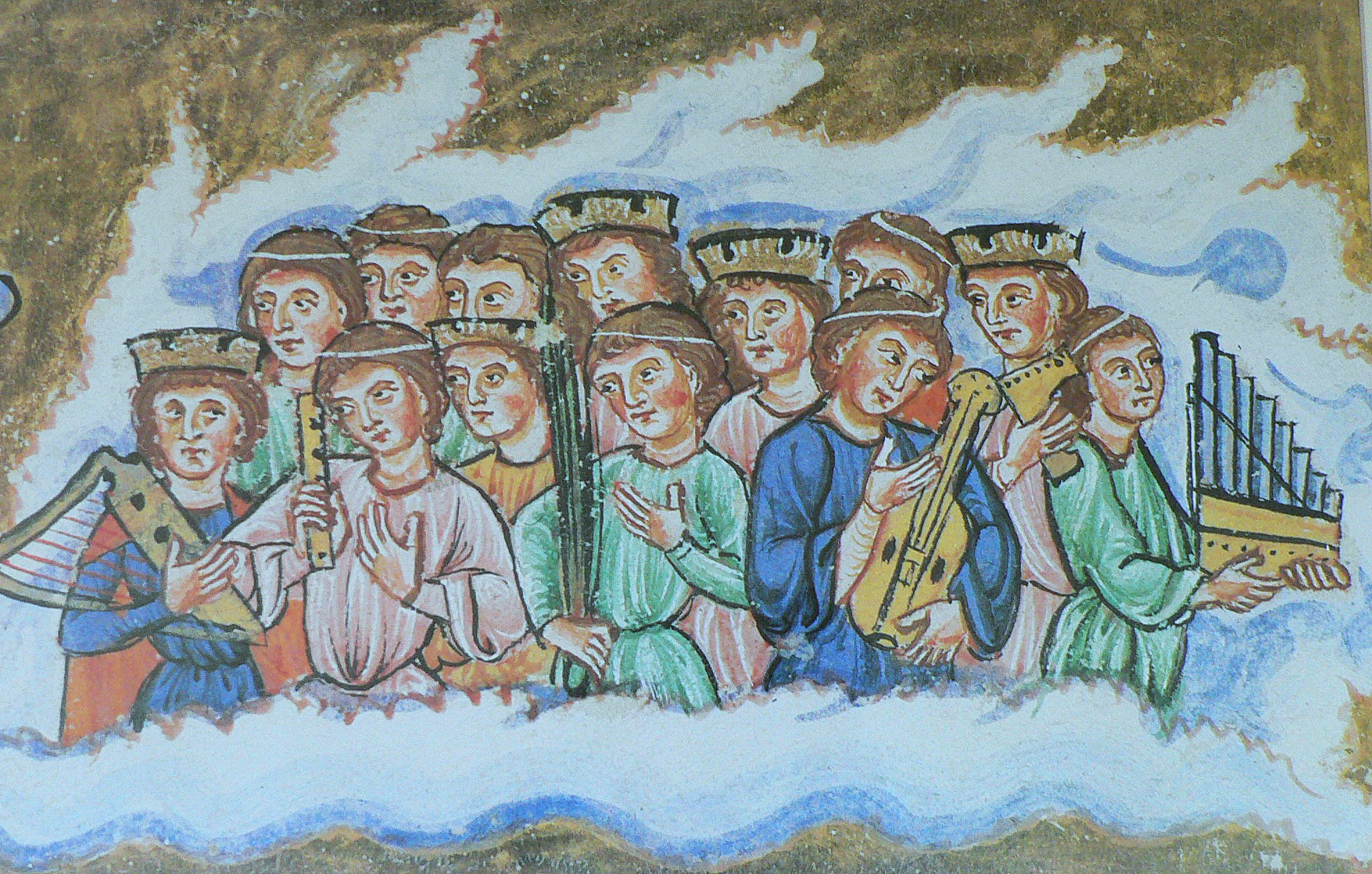
1172–1174 A.D., Germany. Musicians from The Book of Divine Works by Hildegard of Bingen. From left: harp, flute or recorder, unknown, vielle (with 2 drone strings), panpipes, portative organ.

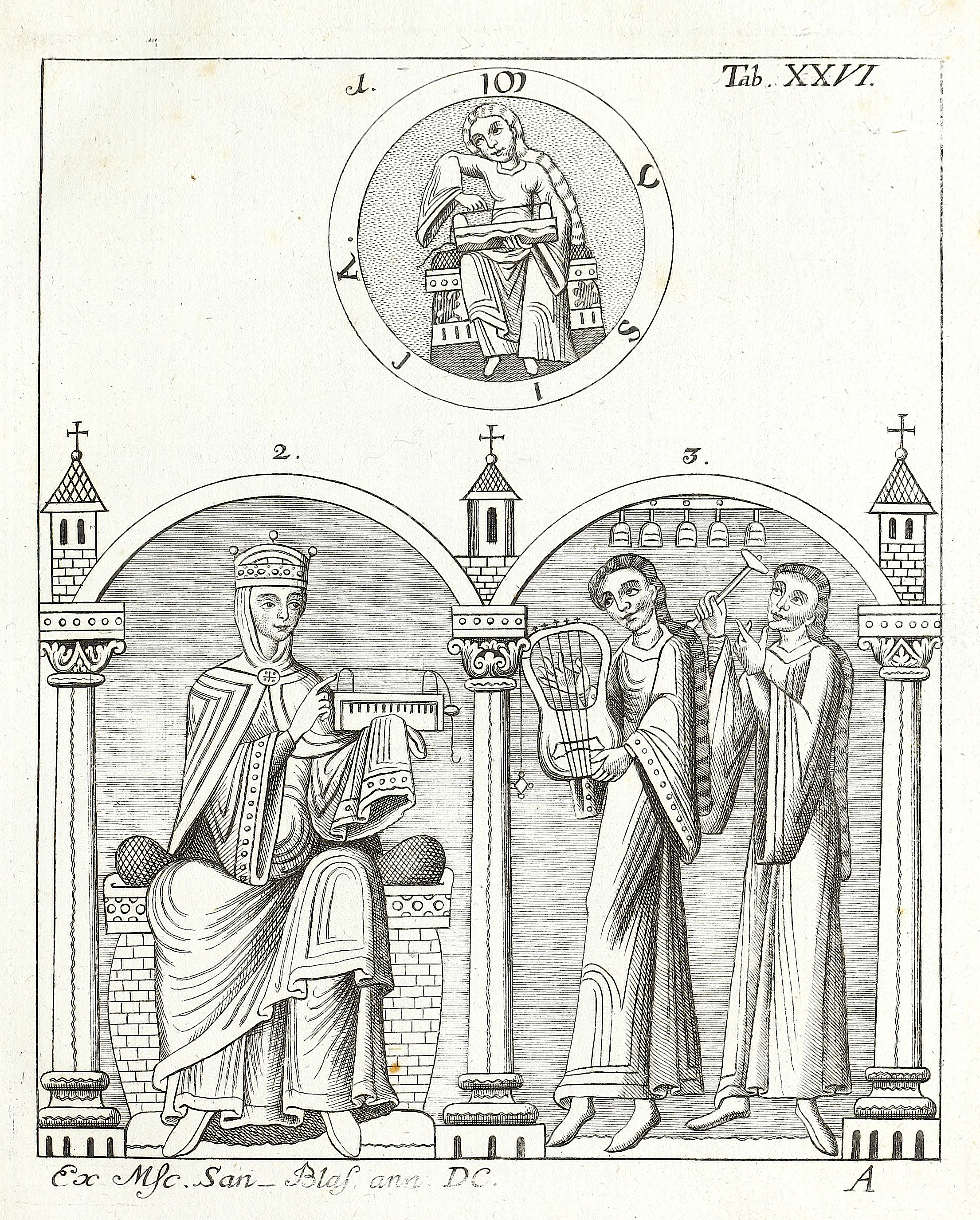
12th century A.D., Germany, copy printed in 1774. Martin Gerber made tracings of this image from a 12th c. manuscript. The original manuscript burned in 1768 with the abbey. Monochord, rotte and cymbala are illustrated.

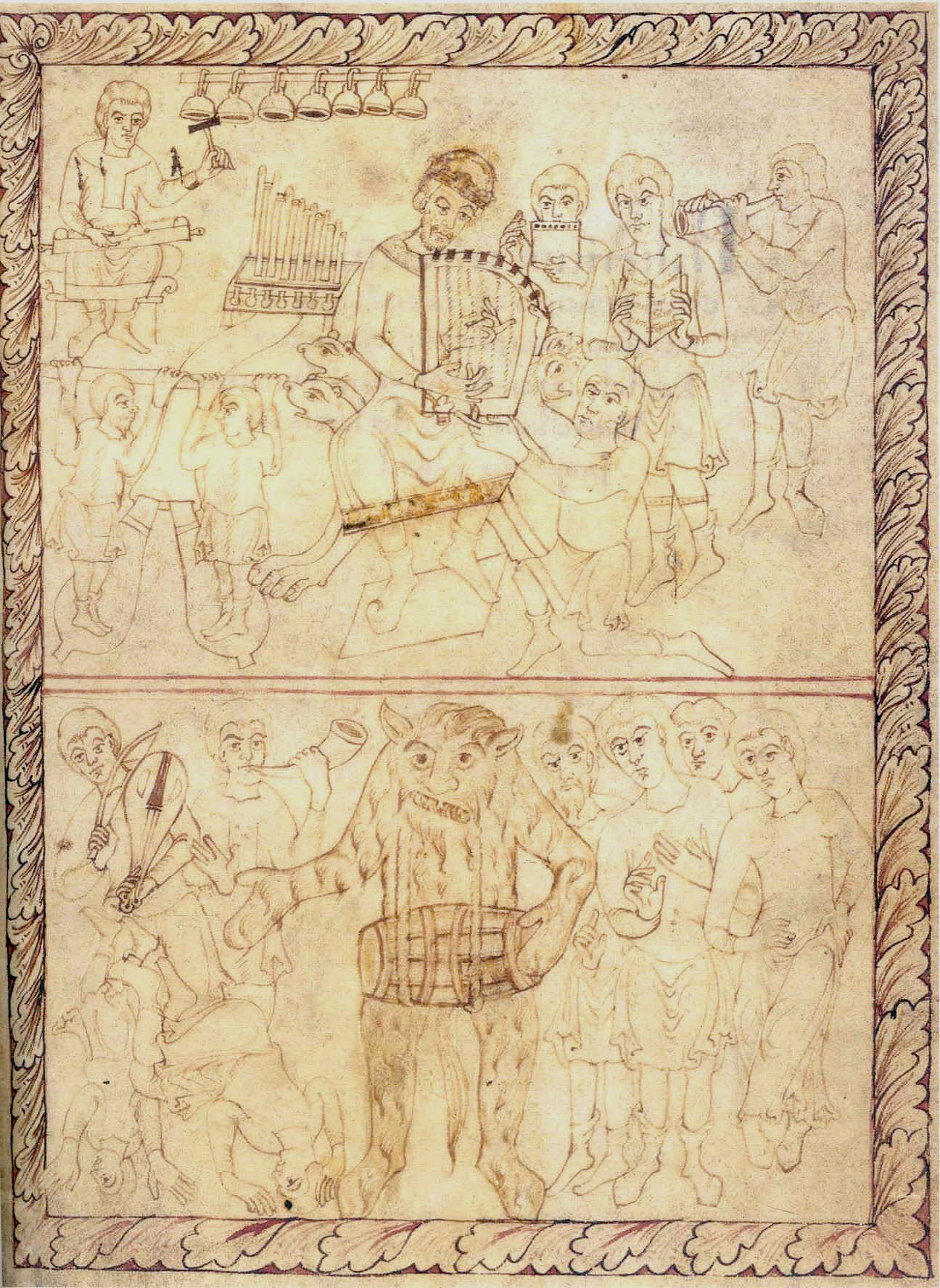
Early 12th century A.D. Top, spiritual music, King David surrounded by musicians. Bottom, carnal or secular music, the devil surrounded by dancers and musicians. From PSALTERIUM TRIPLEX, B.18, f.1r, St John's College Cambridge

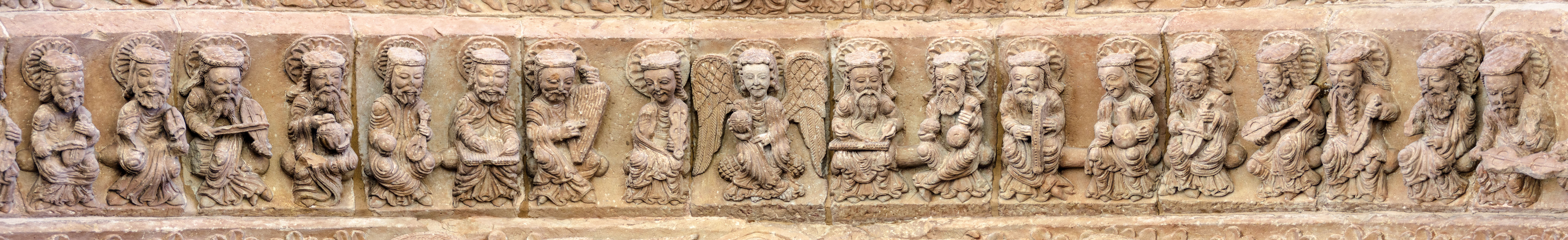
12th century A.D., Spain. Some of the 24 Elders of the Apocalypse on the Church of Saint Dominic, Soria. Instruments include rebecs and rabels (both plucked and bowed), rottes, psalteries and a organistrum.

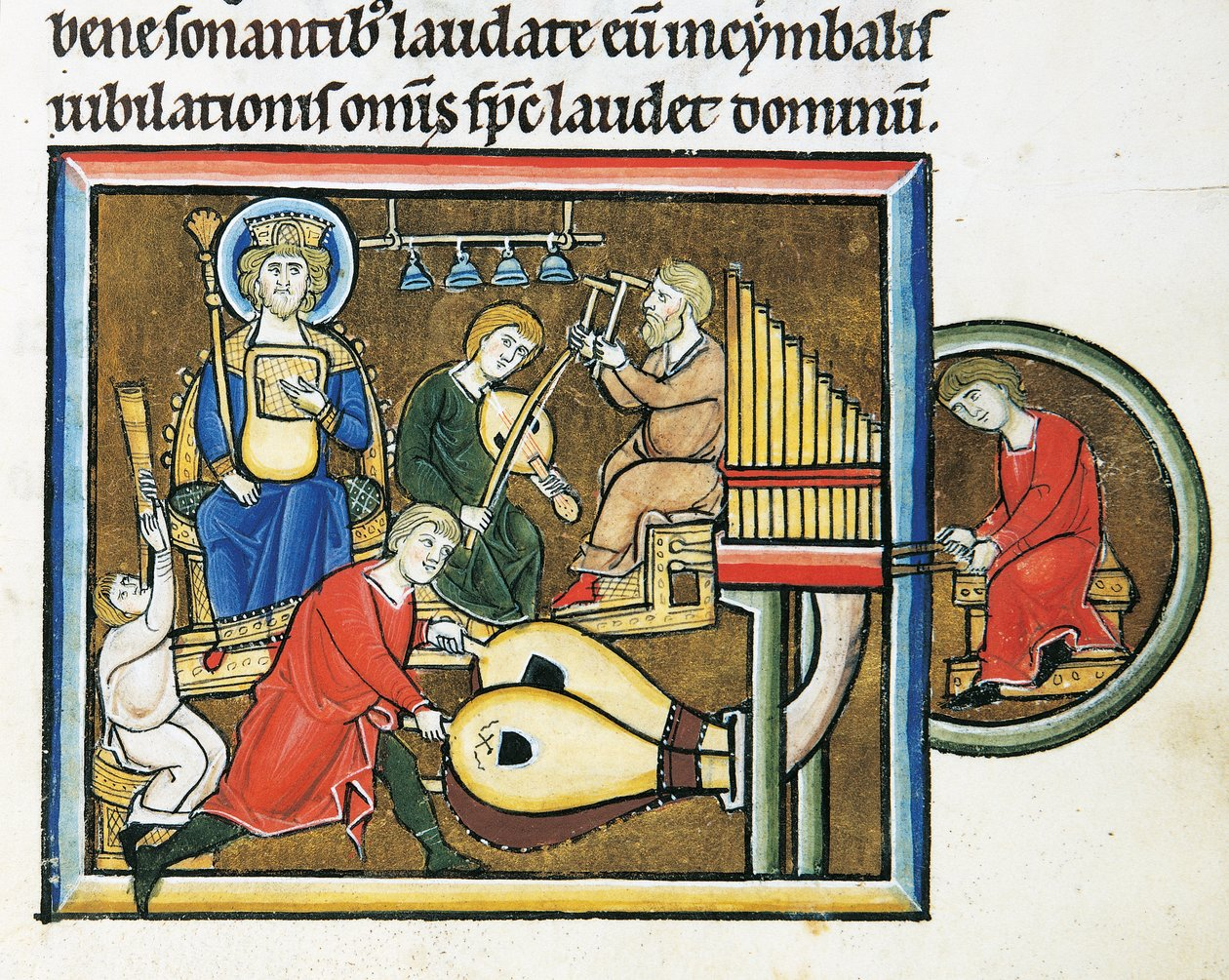
1201–1208 A.D. Germany, St. Elizabeth's Psalter. King David holding the rotte (lyre) and musicians playing chime bells, vielle, pipe organ and long wooden horn

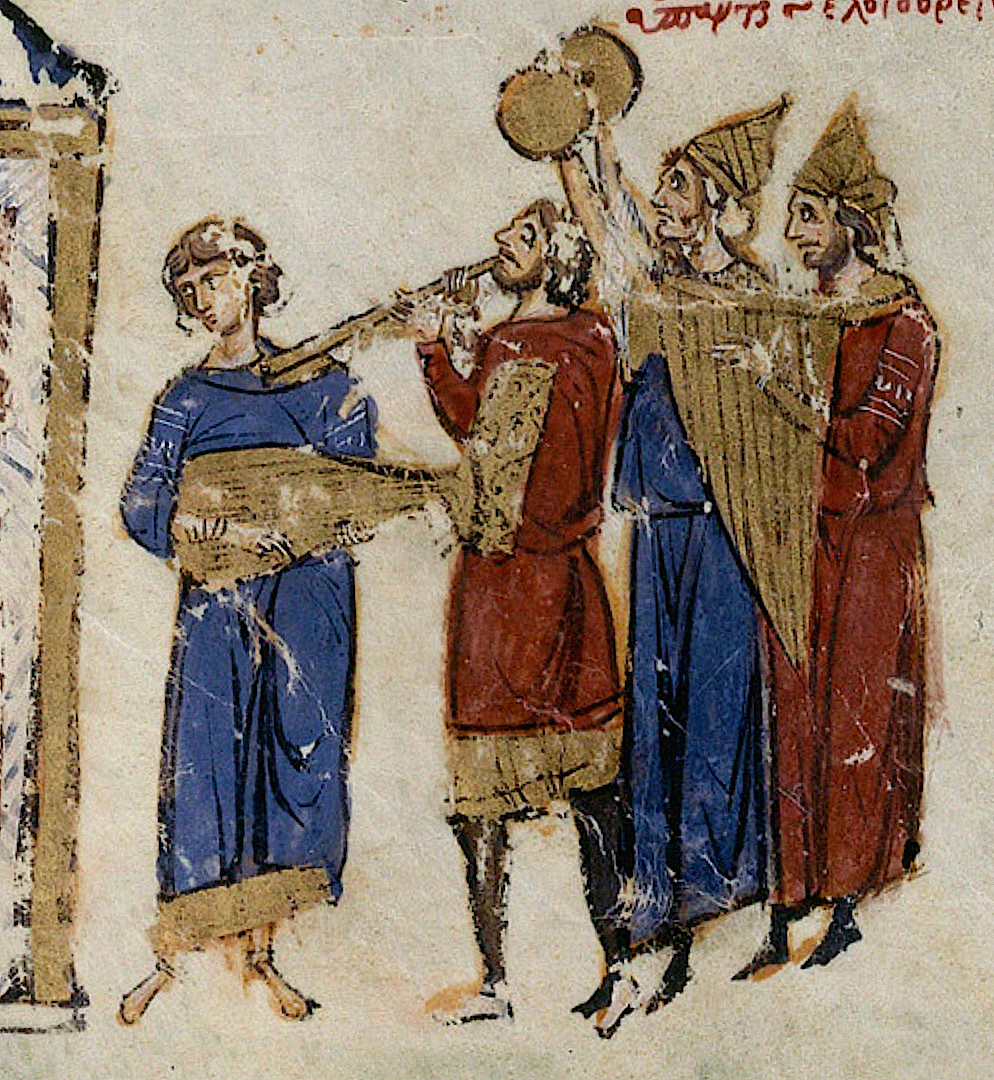
12th-13th century A.D., Palermo, Sicily. Byzantine musical instruments: lute, trumpet or shawm, cymbals, rota. Skylitzes Manuscript, Madrid, National Library, codex vitr. 26-2, page 173 (folio 78r).

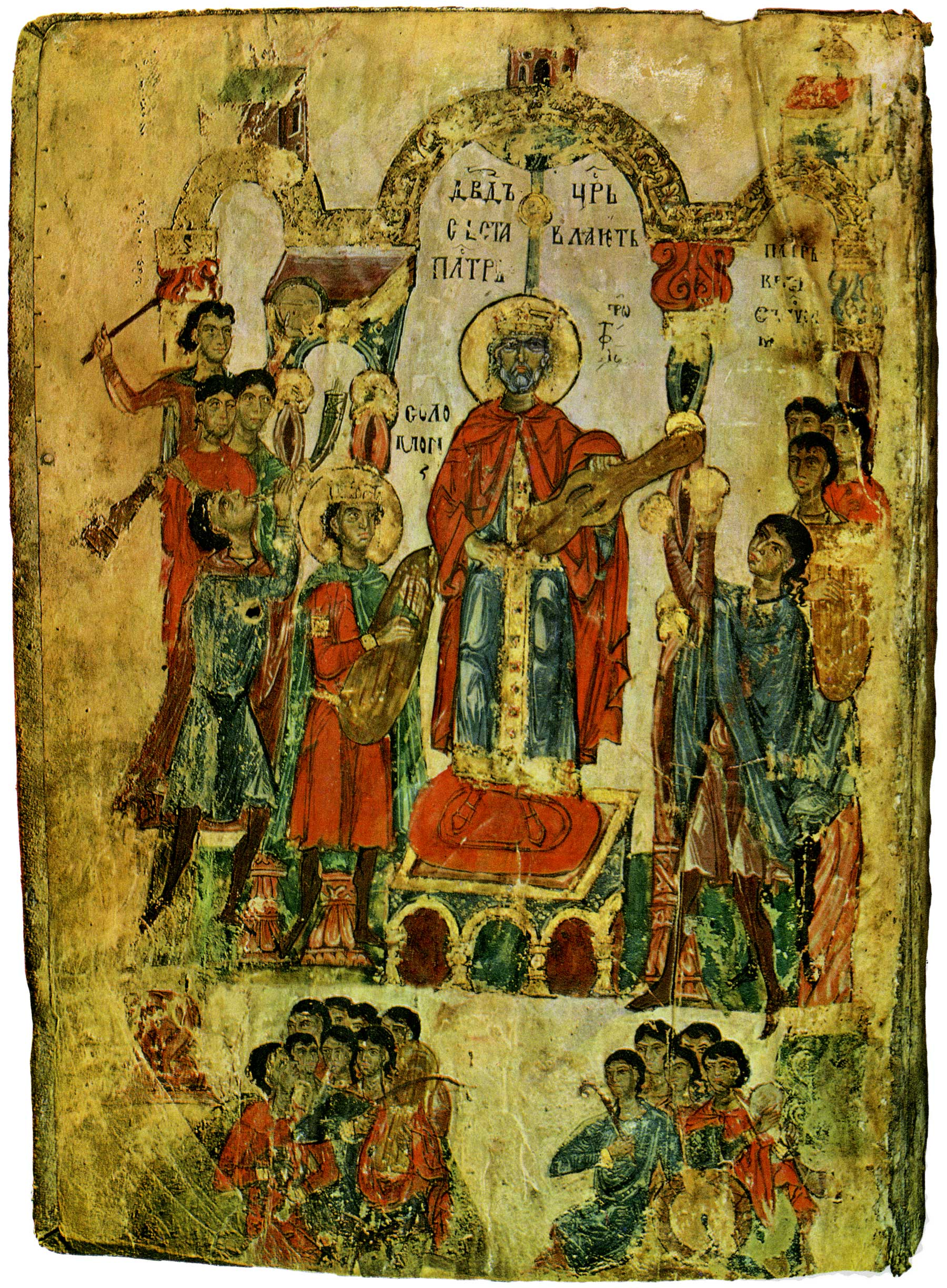
13th century, Russia. King David (center) plays organistrum or hurdy-gurdy. To David's right (our left) man playing naker (drum with snare), probable shawm, zhaleika, gusli (or rotte). To David's left, one man plays cymbals, while another man holds a psaltery. Bottom left corner (our left), a man plays a bowed lyre. Bottom right, a man with drum and curved drumstick. Simonovskaya Psalter, State Historical Museum, Moscow, Russia.

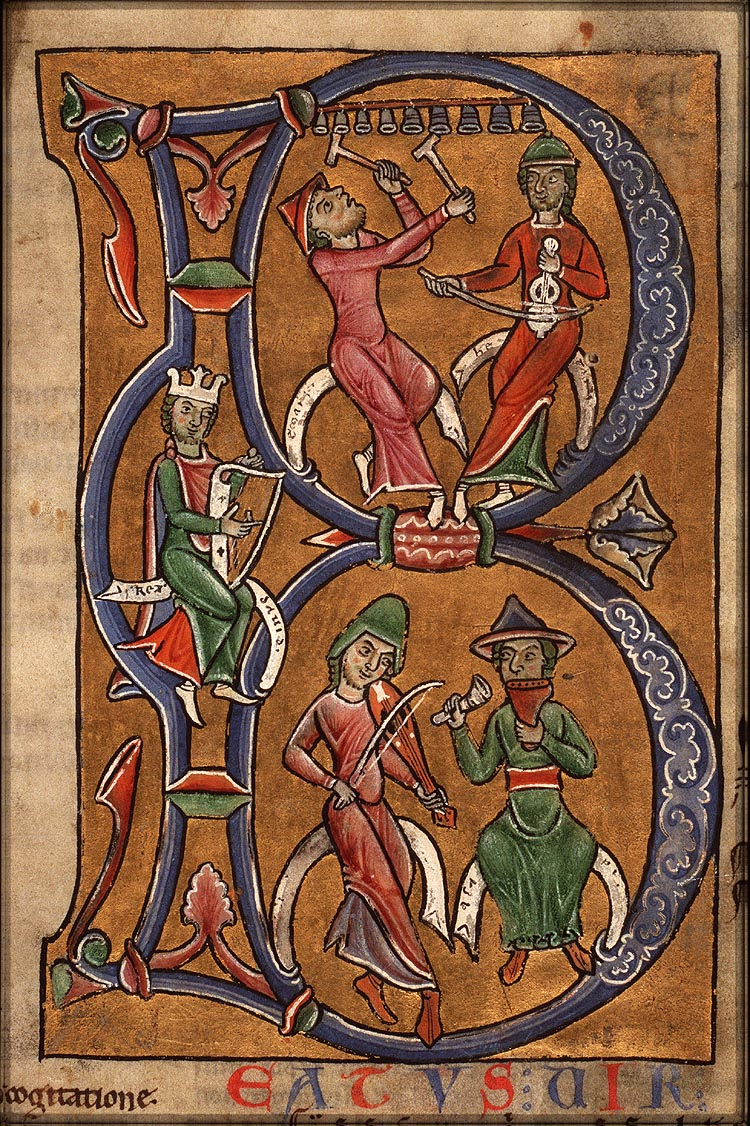
1200-1250, France. King David playing harp with Asaph (panpipe and shofar), Aeman (cymbala), Ethan (viol) and Jeduthun (rebec), Bout Psalter Book of Hours

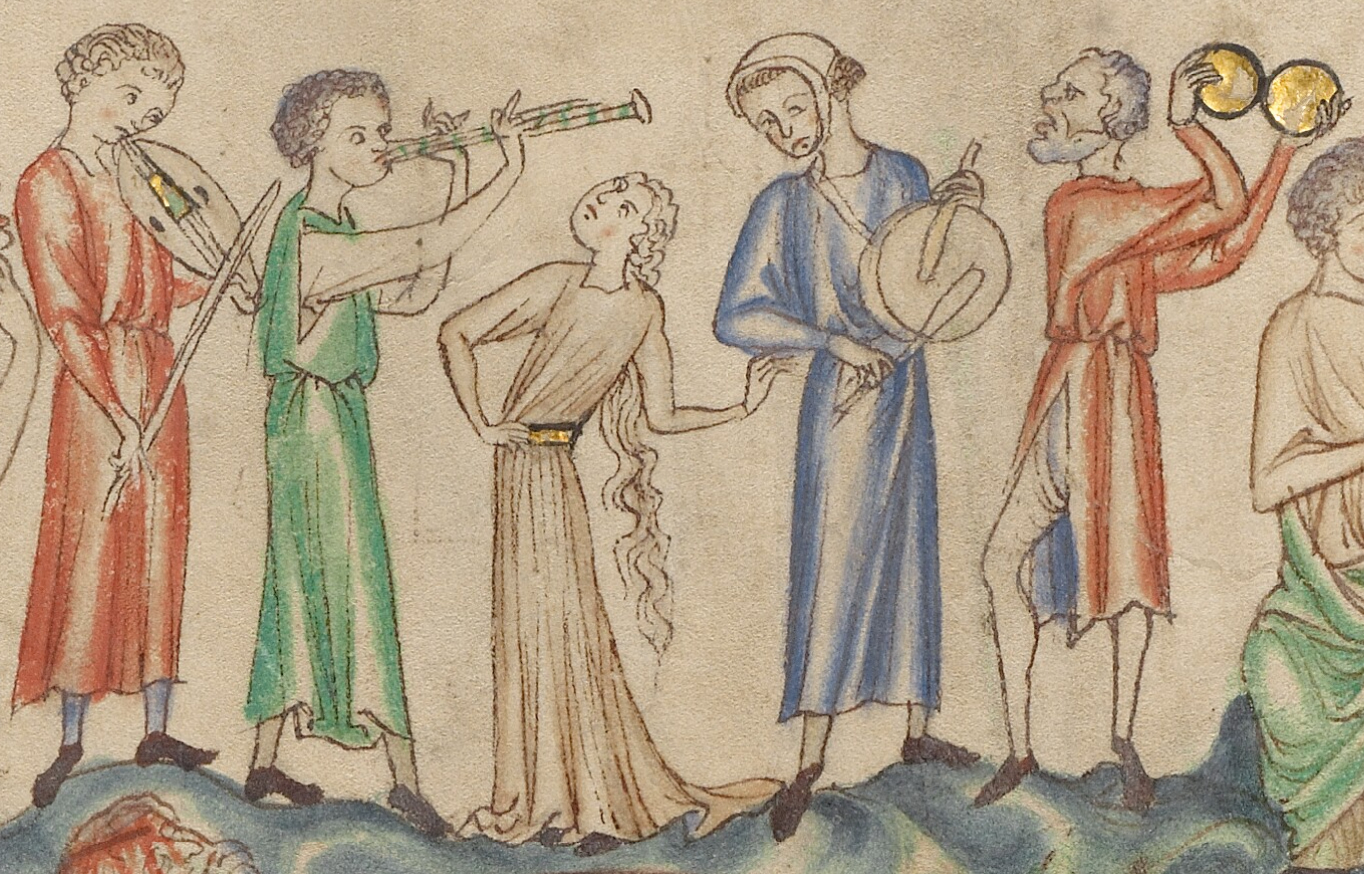
1255–1260 A.D., England. Celebrations with musicians in work titled "The Unburied Bodies of the Two Witnesses and the Rejoicing People", Ms. Ludwig III 1 (83.MC.72), fol. 17v. From left: vielle, triple pipes, tabor or drum, cymbals.

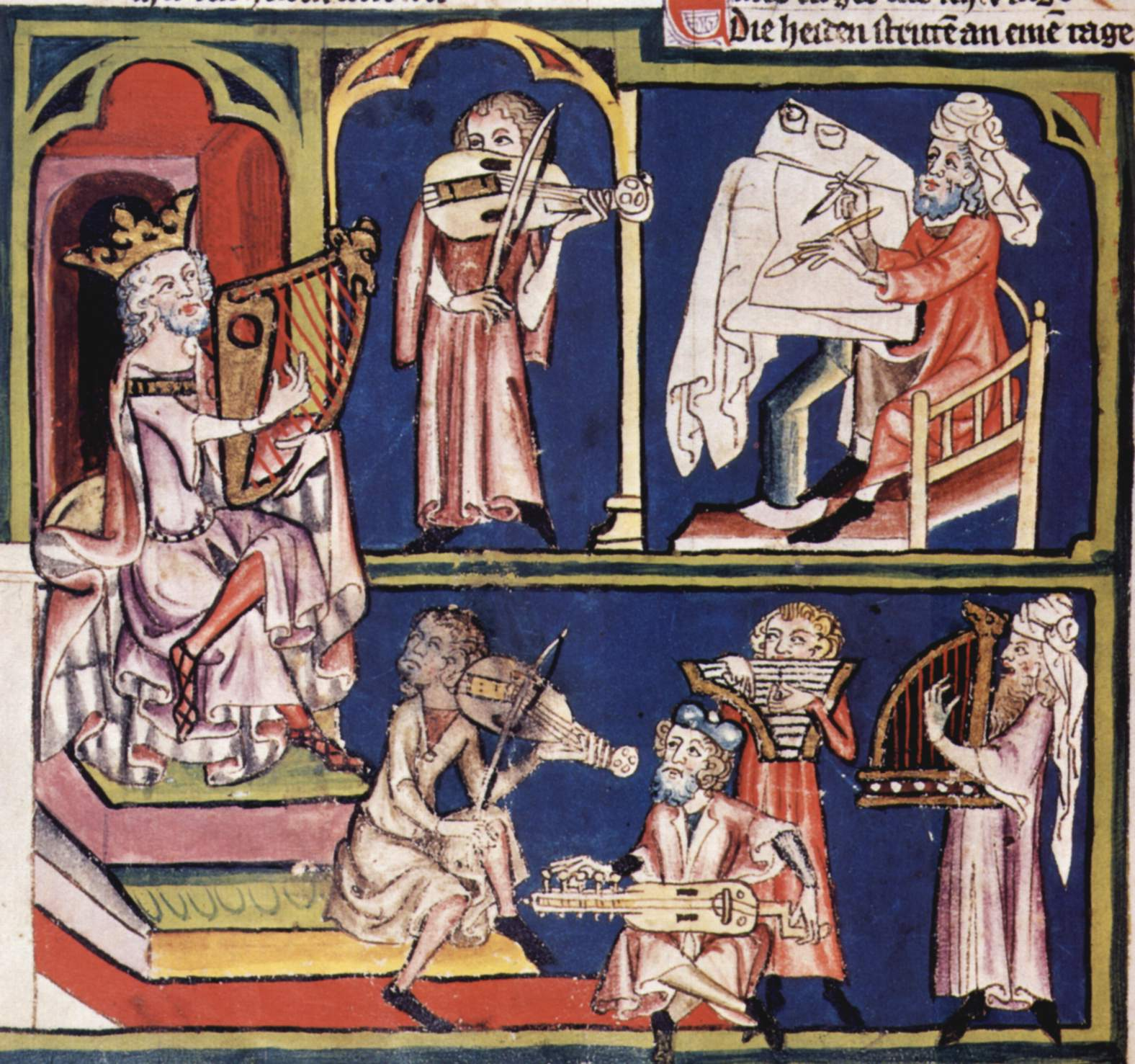
1340 A.D., Germany. King David with scribes and musicians, detail from World Chronicle of Rudolf von Ems.

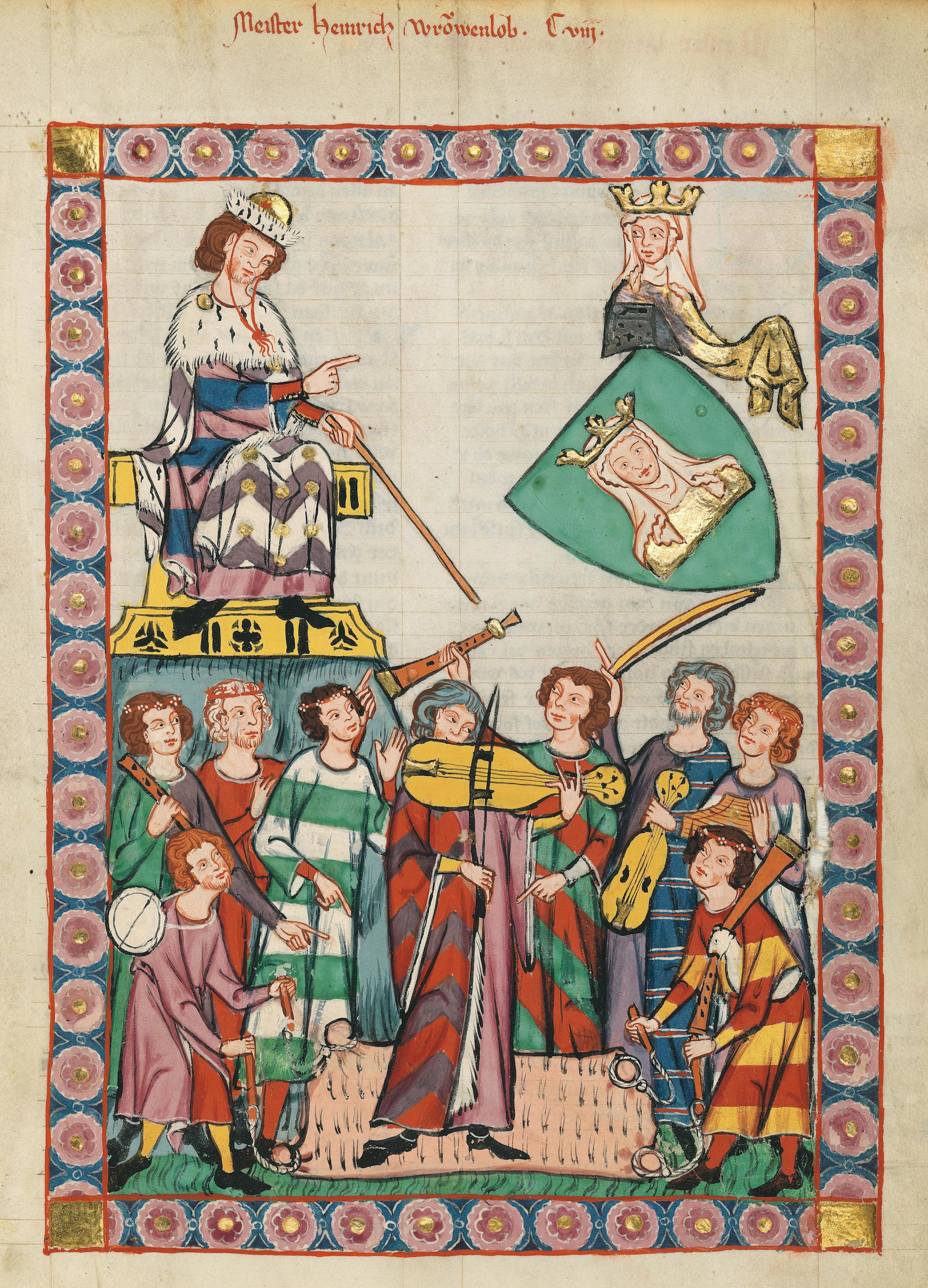
1305–1340 A.D., Zurich, Switzerland. Heinrich Frauenlob, a Minnesinger (seated, top) in the Codex Manesse. From bottom left: Tabor, recorder, shawm, vielle, vielle, psaltery, bagpipe.

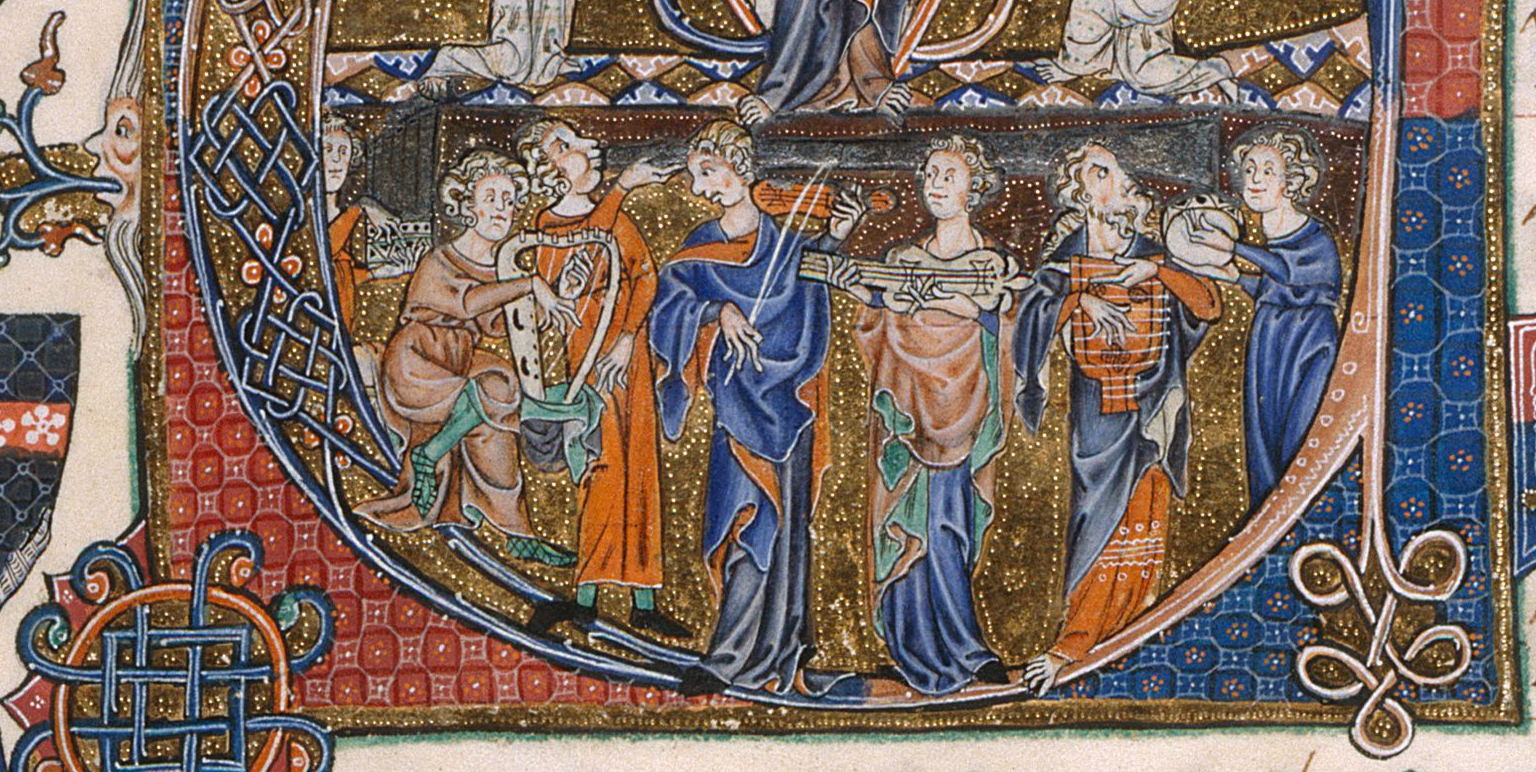
1310, England. Gorleston psalter, folio 107v. Instruments from left: castagnette, harp, singing, rebec, citole, psaltery, tambourine.

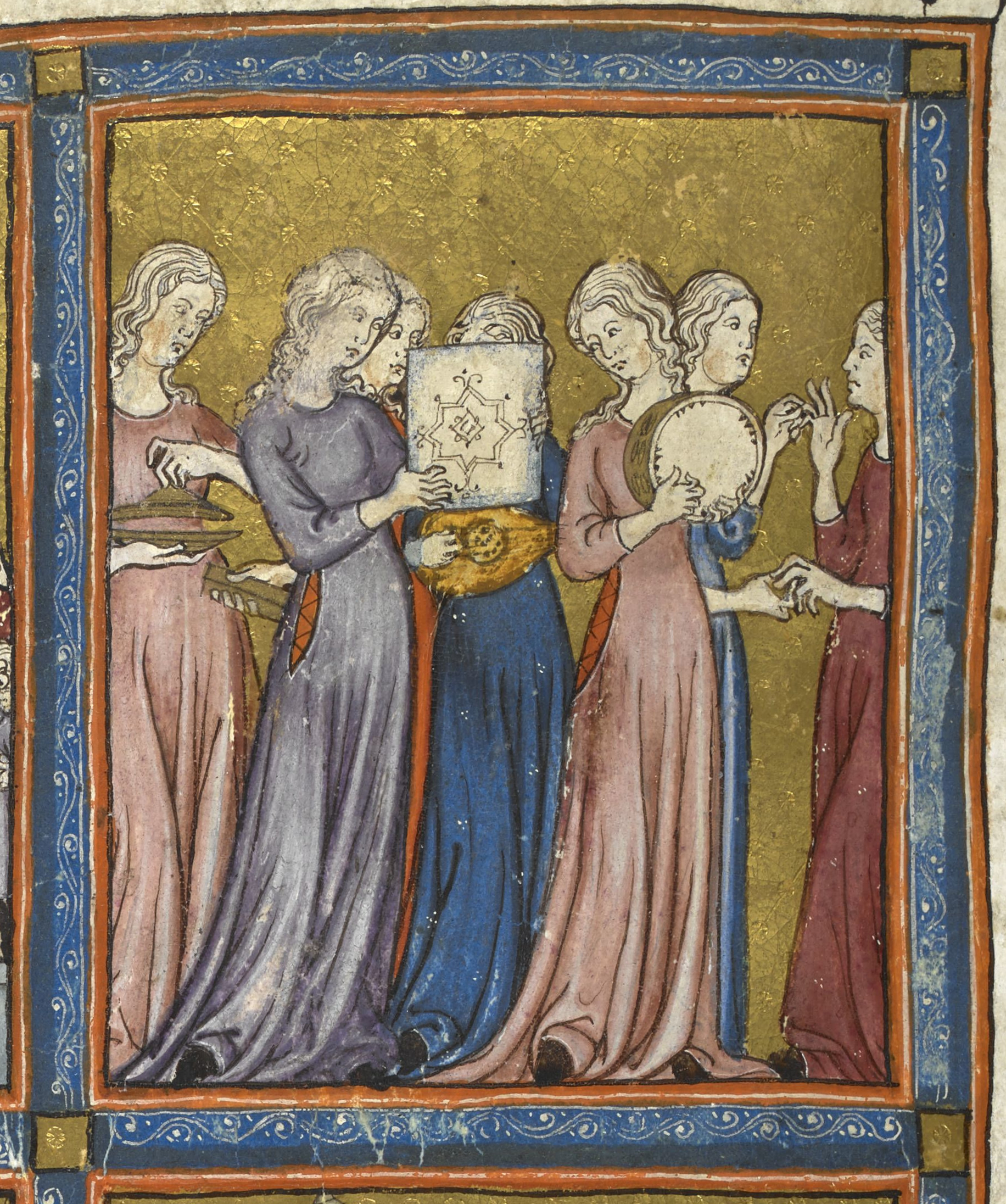
Circa 1320–1330, Catalonia. Women playing instruments from the Golden Haggadah; (from left) cymbals, adufe, lute, timbrel, women dancing.

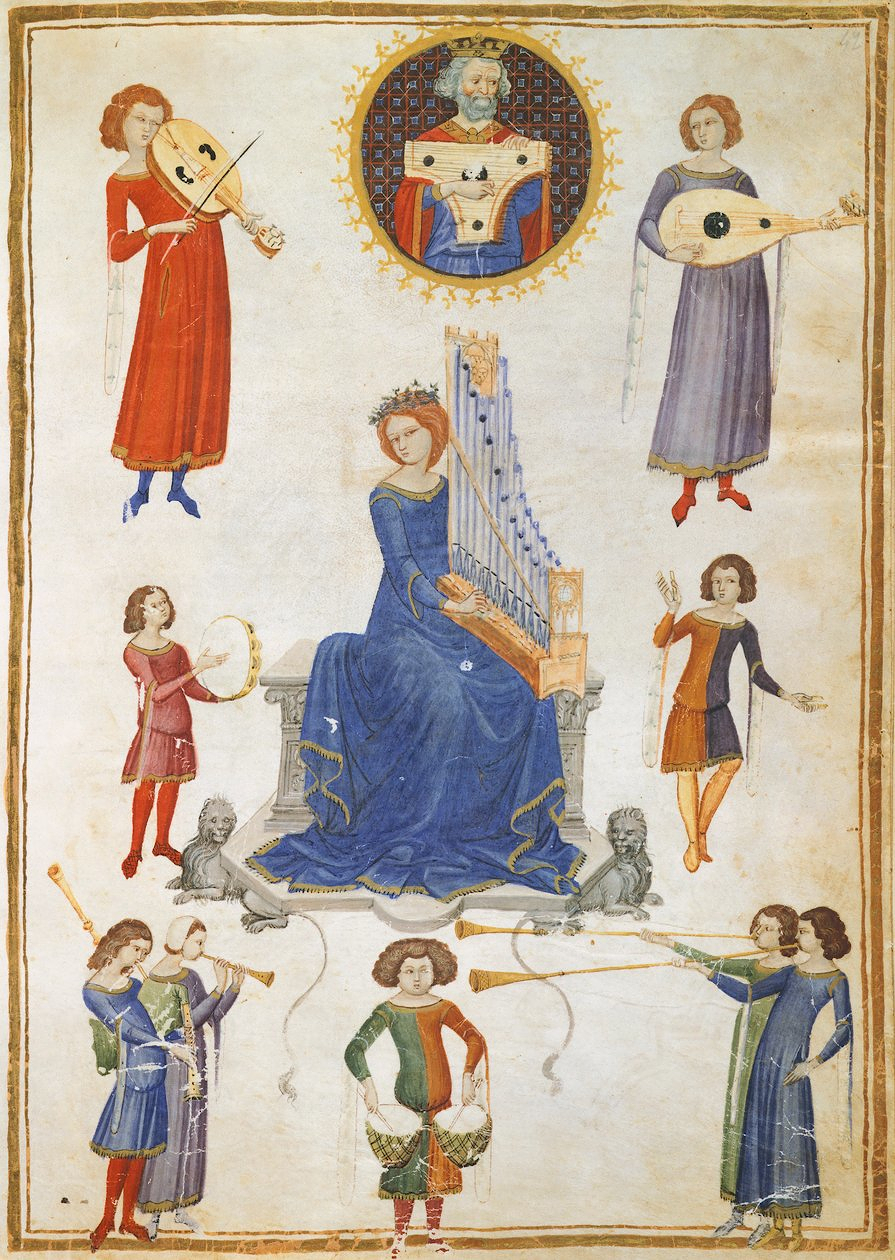
14th century A.D., Italy. King David, his wife Musica and their children. From manuscript of Manlius Severinus Boethius's De Musica, Naples, Biblioteca Nazionale, Ms. VA 14, fol. 47

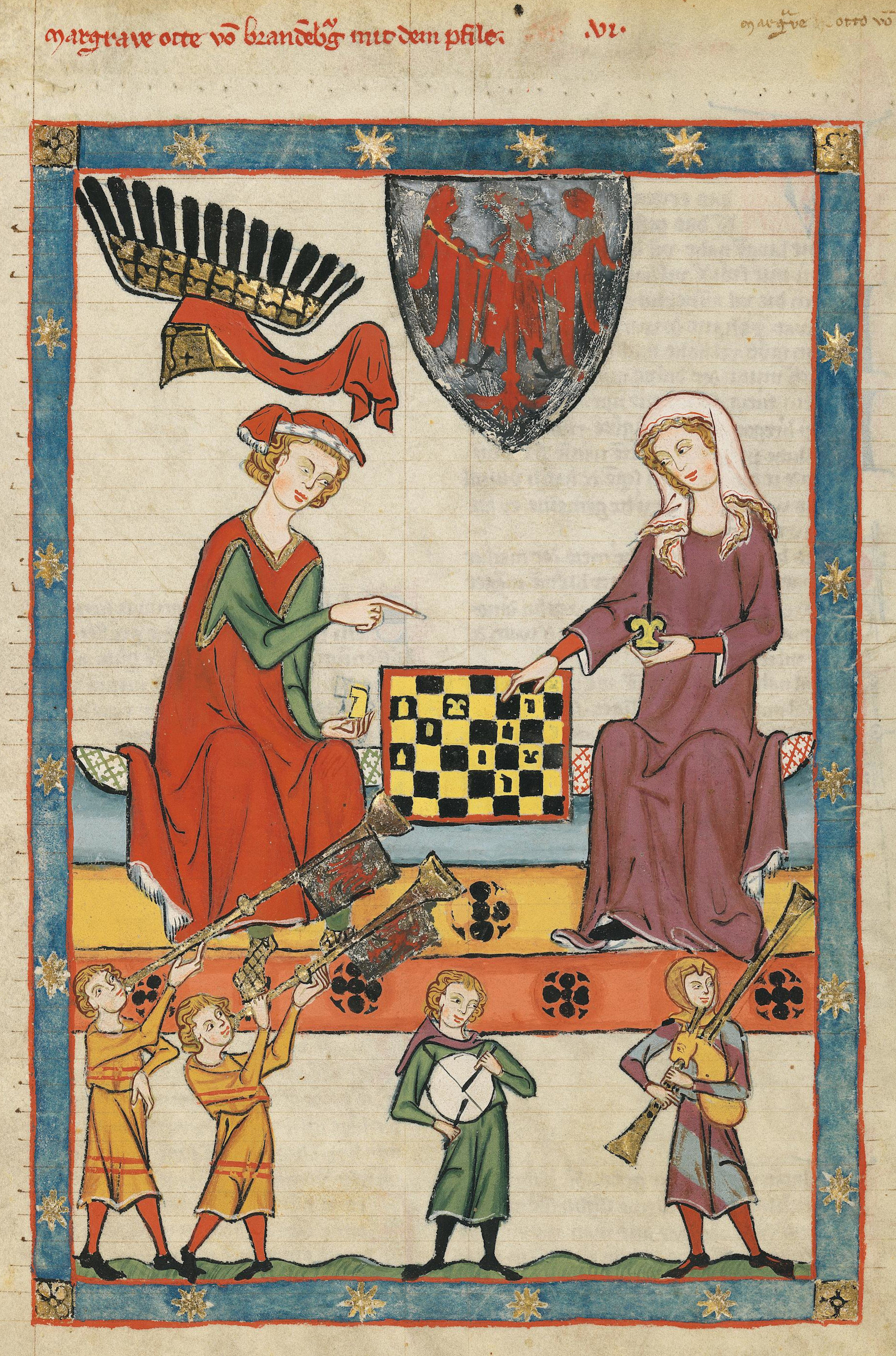
1305 and 1340 A.D., Zurich, Switzerland. Codex Manesse showing King Otto IV of Brandenburg playing chess with a woman. Below are buisines, tabor drum with two drumsticks, and bagpipes.

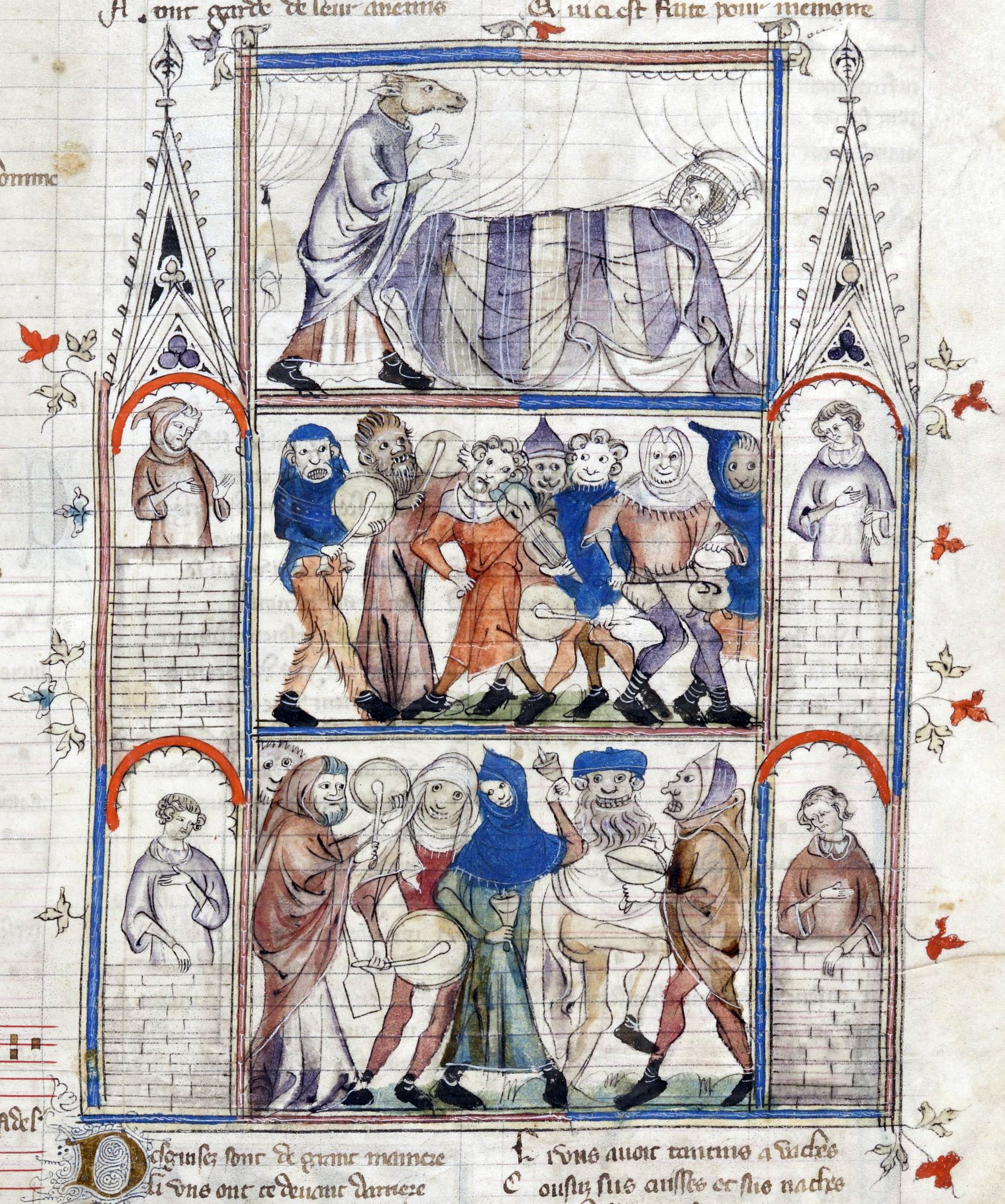
14th century, France. In this illustration from the satirical collection of music and poetry Roman de Fauvel, the horse Fauvel is about to join Vainglory in the bridal bed and the people (dressed as mummers) form a charivari in protest.

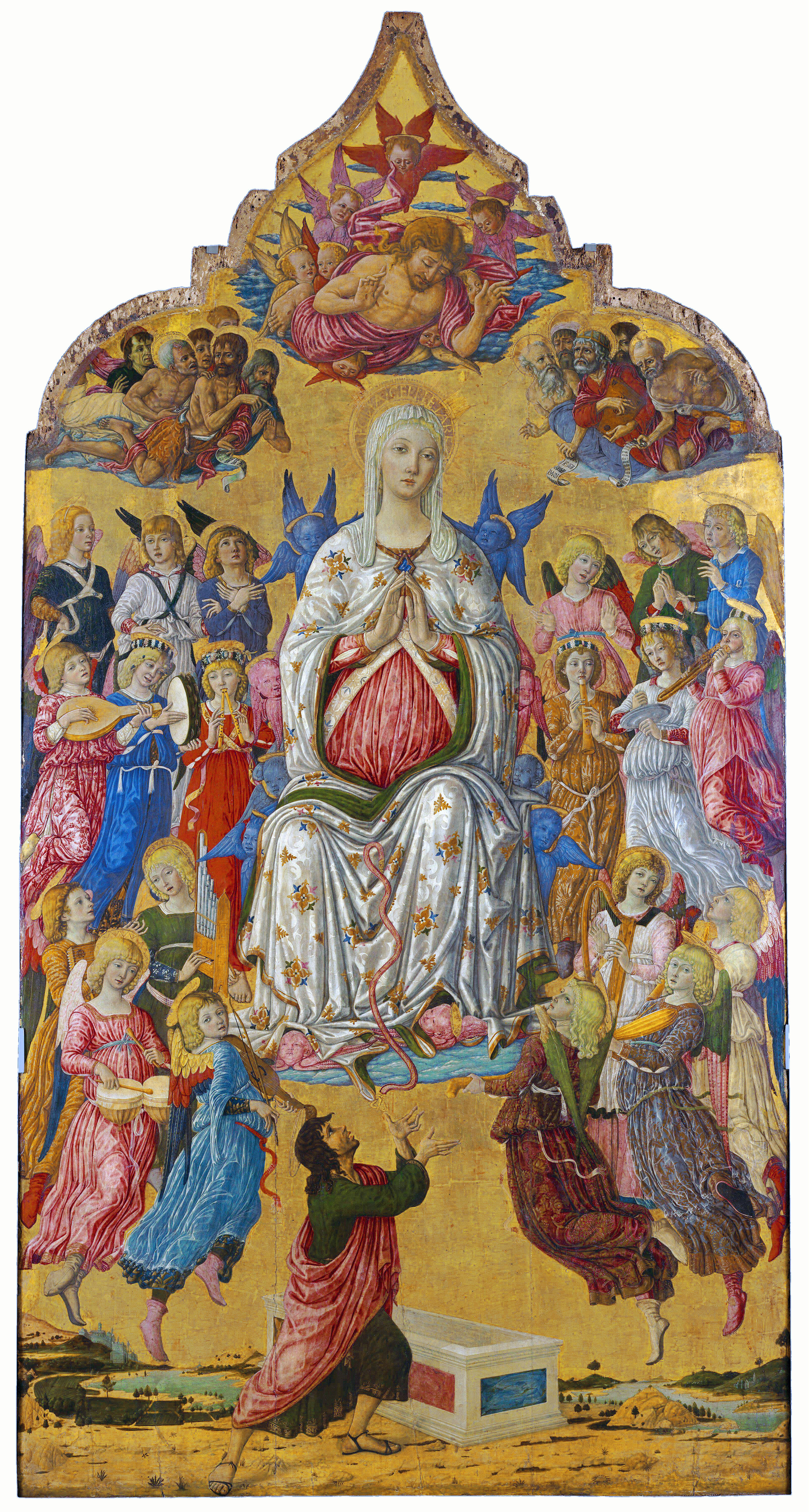
1474 A.D., Italy. The Assumption of the Virgin by Matteo di Giovanni.

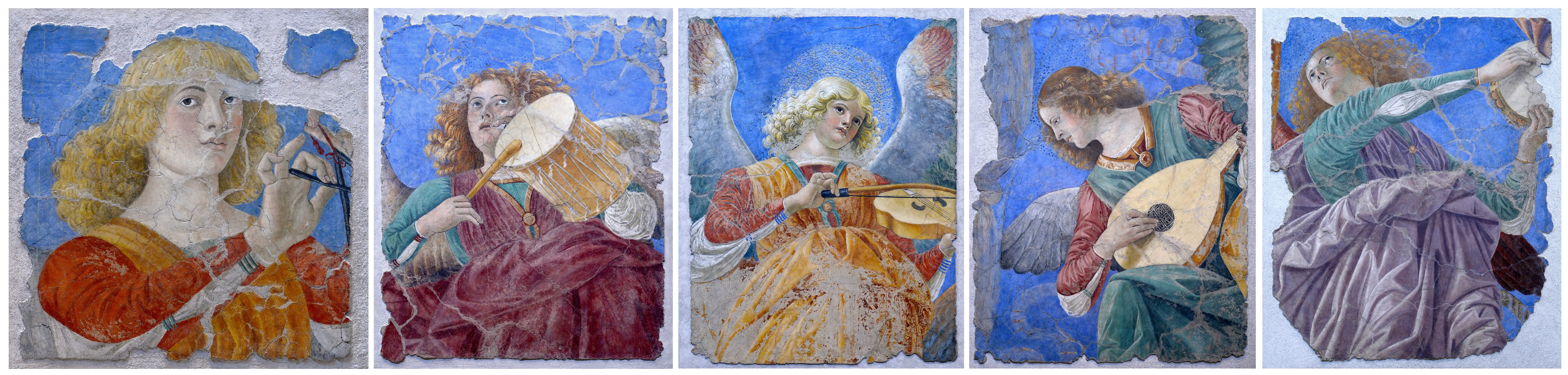
1480 A.D., Italy. Remnants of a fresco from Santi Apostoli, Rome, damaged during renovation in 1711. Triangle,pipe and tabor, vielle, lute, tambourine.

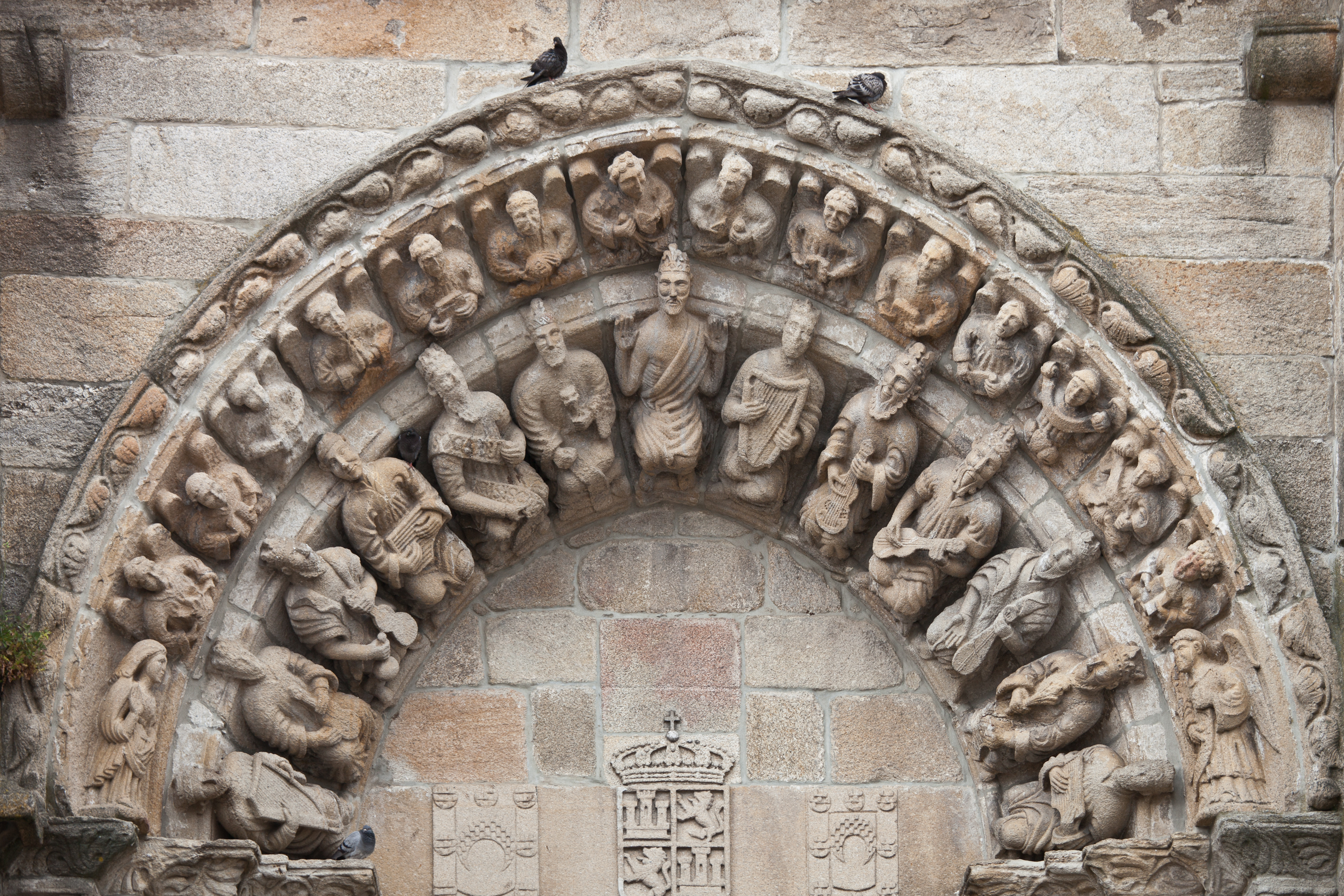
Circa 1434, Spain. Jesus Christ surrounded by twelve men with instruments and wearing crowns, above the main entrance of the Church of San Martiño de Noia.

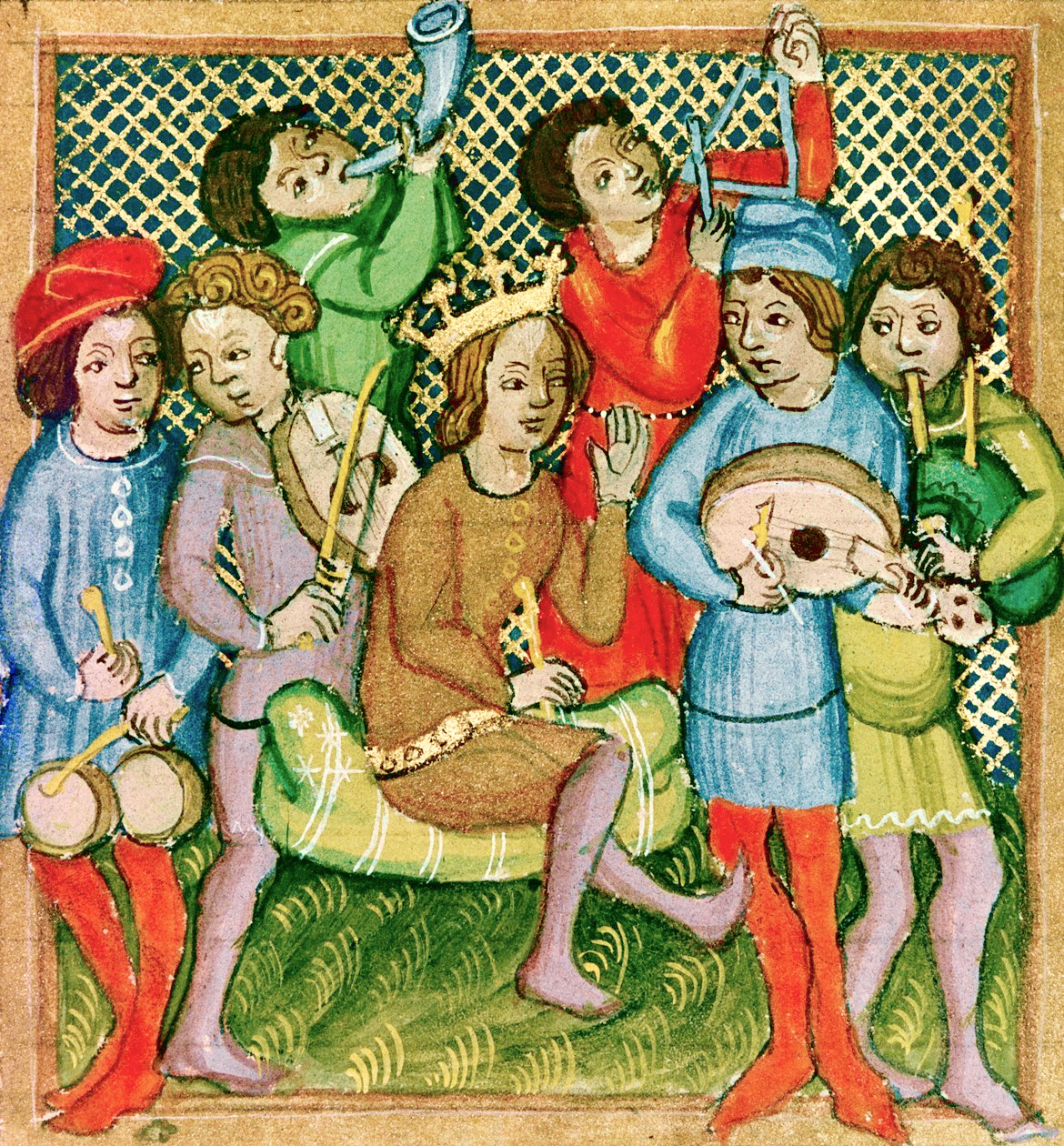
1417 A.D., Olomouc, Moravia. David (sitting) surrounded by musicians or troubadours in a picture from the Olomouc Bible. From left: nakers, vielle, horn, triangle, lute, bagpipes

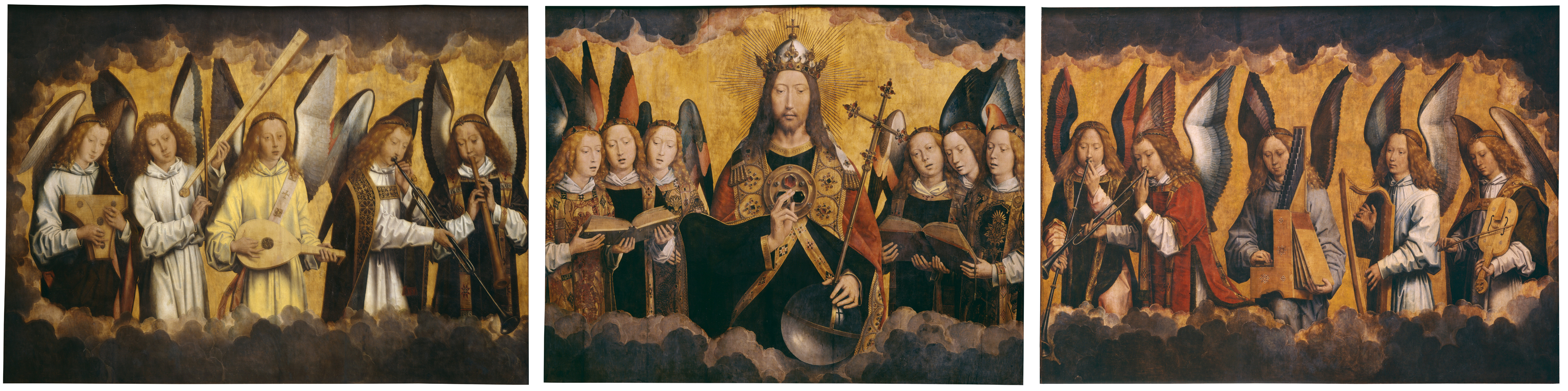
1480s, Germany. Christ with Singing and Music-Making Angels by Hans Memling.
