= Rotte (lyre) =

Medieval string instrument originating from Anglo-Saxon England

Rotte Hearpe Germanic lyre
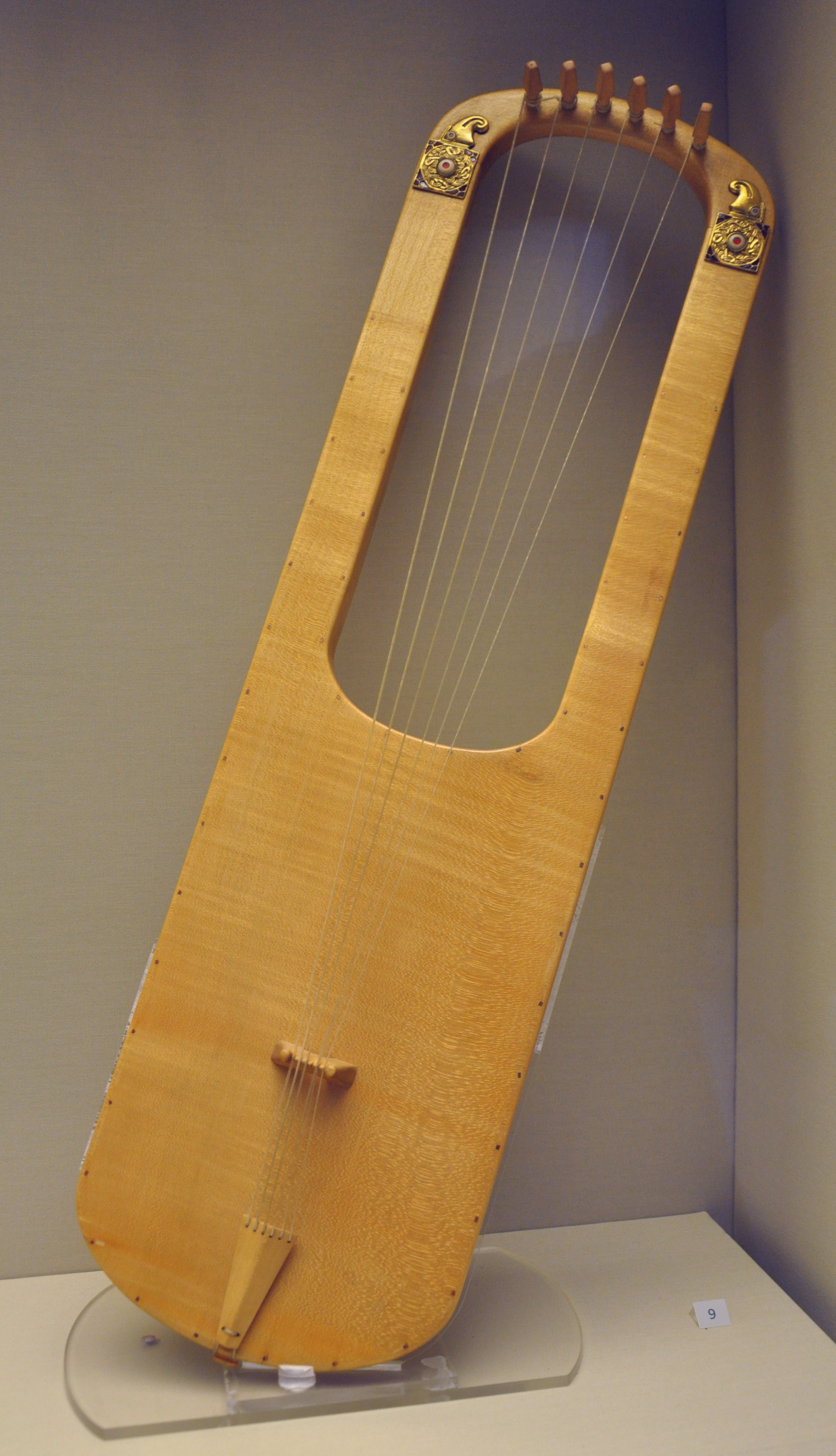
- Replica of the Sutton Hoo lyre, British Museum. This Anglo-Saxon version of the instrument was known as the hearpe, a name for plucked-stringed instruments that would later apply to the medieval harp.

String instrument
- Other names: Germanic lyre; Round lyre; Viking lyre, Scandinavian lyre; Anglo-Saxon lyre; harpa (ONorse); hearpe (OEng); cruð (OEng); cruit (OIrish), crot; crowd (MidEng); chrotta (OHGer, Latin); hruozza (OHGer); lyra, lira, lire (MedLatin); rota (OProv); rotta (OHGer, OProv, MedLatin); rote (OFr, MidEng); rotte (MidHGer); sambuca (MedLatin)
- Hornbostel–Sachs classification: 321.22 (Yoke lutes. Composite chordophone in which the strings run in a plane parallel to the sound table, with a yoke (a cross-bar and two arms) that lies lying in the same plane as the sound-table, with a bowl-shaped resonator)
- Developed: descendant of the ancient lyre which originated in western Asia; cousin to Asian instruments adopted in Ancient Egypt and Ancient Greece

Related instruments
- Plucked lyres: List: Phorminx; Kinnor; Kithara; Lyre; Bowed lyres: List: Chrotta; Crwth; Giga; Gue; Jouhikko; Stråkharpa; Talharpa

See Rotte (psaltery) for the medieval psaltery, or Rote for the fiddle

Rotte or rotta is a historical name for the Germanic lyre, used in northwestern Europe in the early medieval period (circa 450 A.D.) into the 13th century. Differing from the lyres of the Mediterranean antiquity, Germanic lyres are characterised by a long, shallow and broadly rectangular shape, with a hollow soundbox curving at the base, and two hollow arms connected across the top by an integrated crossbar or ‘yoke’. From northwestern Europe—particularly from England and Germany—an ever-growing number of wooden lyres have been excavated from warrior graves of the first millennium A.D. The plucked variants declined in the medieval era (spreading less often in manuscripts in the 13th century), while bowed variants have survived into modern times.

Non-Greek or Roman lyres were used in pre-Christian Europe as early as the 6th century B.C. by the Hallstatt culture, by Celtic peoples as early as the 1st century B.C., and separately by Germanic peoples. They were played in Anglo-Saxon England, and more widely, in Germanic regions of northwestern Europe. Their existence was recorded in the Scandinavian and Old-English story Beowulf, set in pre-Christian times (5th-6th century A.D.) and written or retold by a Christian scribe about 975 A.D. The Germanic lyre has been thought to be a descendant of the ancient lyre which originated in western Asia. That same instrument was adopted in Ancient Egypt and also by the Ancient Greeks as the cithara. The rotte is shaped differently than these, however, and discoveries from further east has led to the possibility that it arrived with invading tribes.

The oldest rotte found in England dates possibly before 450 AD and the most recent dates to the 10th century. The Germanic lyre was depicted in manuscript illuminations and mentioned in Anglo-Saxon literature and poetry (as the hearpe). Despite this, knowledge of the instrument was largely forgotten, and it was confused with the later medieval harp. Then in the 19th century, two lyres (Oberflacht 84 and 37) were found in cemetery excavations in southwest Germany, giving concrete examples of the Germanic lyre's existence. These discoveries, followed in 1939 by the archaeological excavation at Sutton Hoo and the correct reconstruction of the Sutton Hoo instrument (as a lyre, not a harp) in 1970, brought about the realization that the lyre was "the typical early Germanic stringed instrument."

"Evidence of manuscript illustrations and the writings of early theorists suggest that, in Anglo-Saxon and early medieval times...the words hearpe, rotte and cithara were all used to describe the same instrument, or type of instrument." The direction of the spread of the instrument is uncertain. The instrument may have developed in several locations. Other possibilities include an Irish instrument that spread eastwards to Germany, or an instrument of central Europe that spread northwest. Across Europe, lyres were named with etymologically related variations: crwth, cruit, crot (Celtic); rote and crowd (English); rota, rotta, rote, rotte (French, English, German, Provencal).

The instrument disappeared in most of Europe, surviving in Scandinavia, and elsewhere remembered in medieval images and in literature. In 1774 it was featured in a work of religious musical scholarship by Martin Gerbert, who found an illustration in a 12th century A.D. manuscript and labeled the instrument the Cythara Teutonica. After archeological finds, the instrument has been recreated and studied anew, labeled Germanic round-lyre, Anglo-Saxon lyre, Germanic lyre and Viking lyre today. Historical names include rotta (and variations rota, rotte, rote), harpa (Old Norse) and hearpe (Old-English). Medieval clerics sometimes used lyra, recalling classical Greece and Rome.

== Anglo-Saxon lyre ==
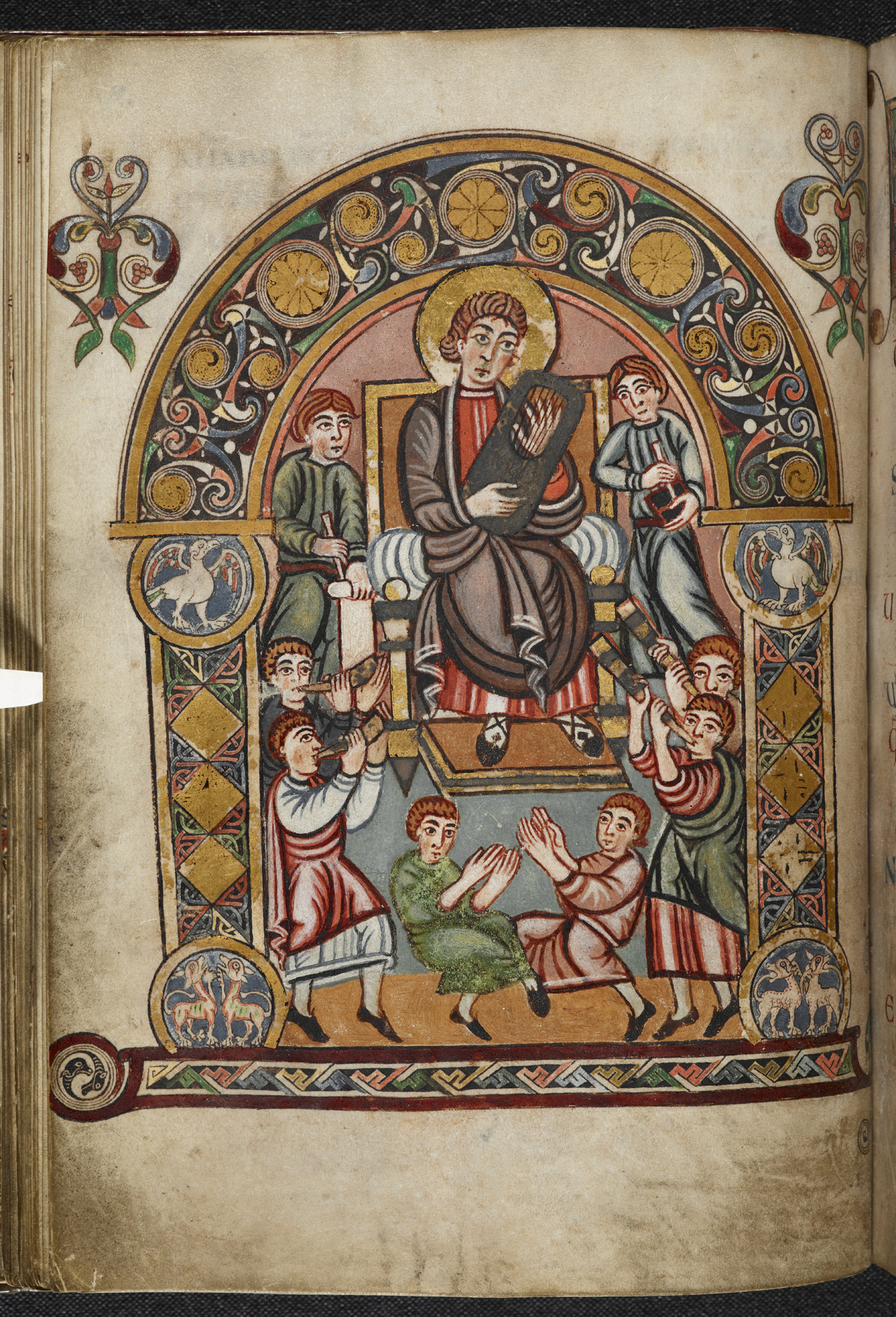
8th century A.D., England. Vespasian Psalter An Anglo-Saxon round lyre or hearpe.

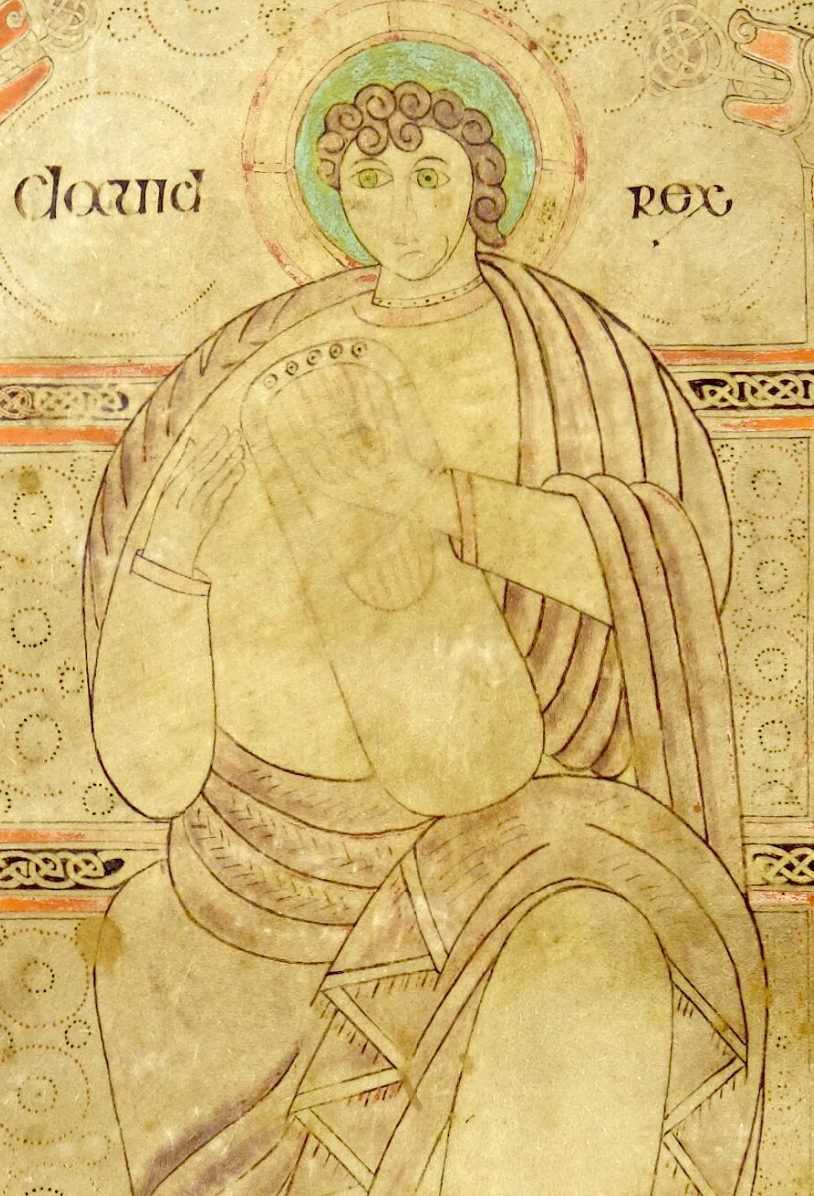
Five-string hearpe from the Durham Cassiodorus, 8th-century England. The instrument sits on the musician's leg as he plays and is supported by a strap around the musician's wrist.

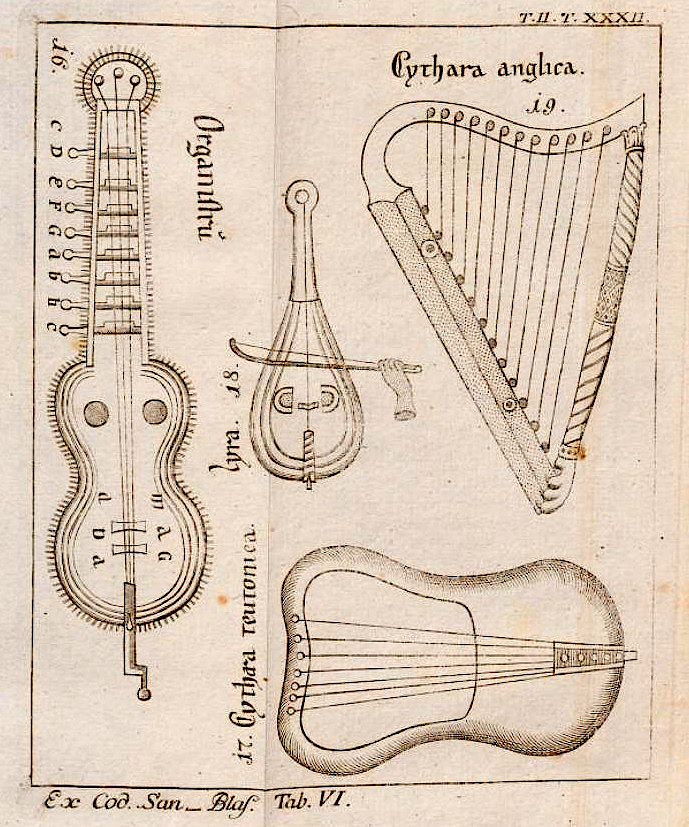
17th-century summary in pictures. By the 12th century, harp (hearpe) applied to the English harp (Cythara anglica). The lyre (Cythara teutonica) continued to be played on the European continent. Cythara was a name for plucked-string instruments in the Latin-language Bible.

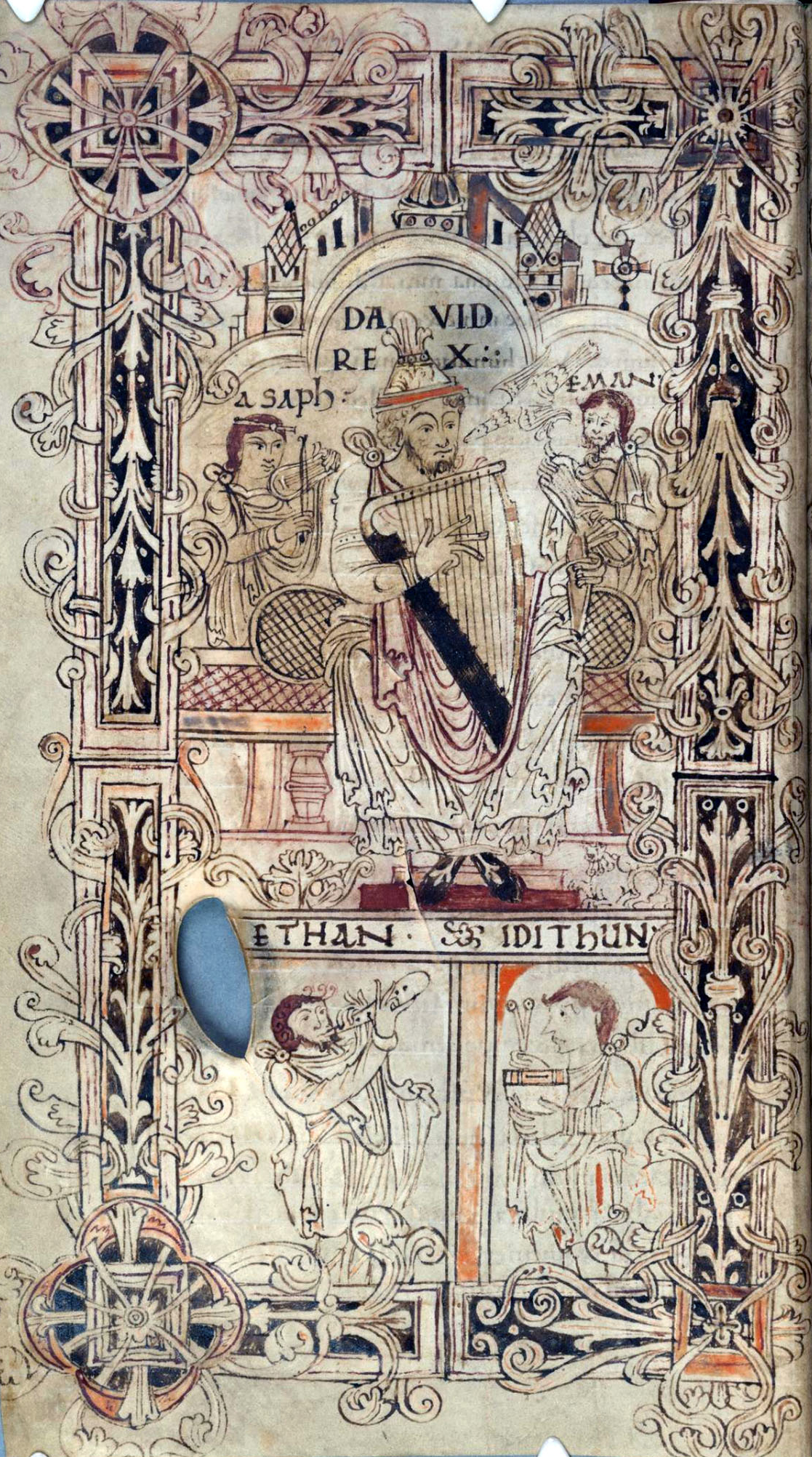
11th century A.D., England. David playing the harp, accompanied by plucked and bowed lyres.

In England, the lyre was called hearpe in Old English. They likely did not use rotta for the lyre. Hearpe lyres were played by the Germanic tribes (Anglo-Saxons) who arrived in England from the continent. Lyres can be seen in English artwork into the 11th century, eventually displaced by the medieval harp. On the continent, lyres continued to be illustrated in manuscripts into the 13th century.

The remains of surviving instruments (largely decayed into fragments) have been discovered in graves. Two instruments have given more information about the instrument's characteristic shape. The Grave at Sutton Hoo contained enough of an instrument to create speculation about just what these instruments were; at first it was thought to be a harp. The grave at Prittlewell was thoroughly decayed, but archaeologists were able to use scans of undisturbed soil to reveal the instrument.

Apart from archaeological finds, another source of information about hearpes comes from historic images.

The Vespasian Psalter, an early 8th-century Anglo-Saxon illustrated book originating from Southumbria (Northern Mercia), shows King David playing the lyre with his court musicians. The theme was commonly repeated across the Christian world, usually with David playing a harp. The image from the Vespasian Psalter gives some insight into how the lyre was played, notably the left hand being used to block strings showing he was using a type of play known as strum and block. This same method of lyre playing appears on many Ancient Greek illustrations of lyre playing.

The Durham Cassiodorus contains an image of King David playing the Anglo-Saxon lyre. The book originates from Northumbria some time in the 8th century.

Another manuscript image of the hearpe being plucked can be found in the Utrecht Psalter, a 9th Century book of illustrations from the Netherlands.

A 9th century Anglo-Saxon sculptured image appeared in relief on a column at Masham, North Yorkshire. The image shows David holding what is "clearly a round-lyre of contemporaneous Germanic type."

According to musician Andrew Glover-Whitley, "music [among the Anglo-Saxons] was seen as coming from the Gods and was a gift from Woden who was, amongst many things, the God of knowledge, wisdom and poetry and as such bestowed the ‘magic’ of music on the people. ... It was also seen as a power to do good or evil, to help cure people of maladies of the mind, soul or body as well as able to inflict harm on enemies and to conjure up spirits that would be of help or to do your bidding against enemies."

There are 21 mentions of the lyre in Anglo-Saxon poetry, five of these in Beowulf. Mentions of the lyre in literature commonly associate it as accompanying storytelling, being used during celebrations or in context of war.

þaér wæs gidd ond gléo: gomela Scilding
felafricgende feorran rehte·
wílum hildedéor hearpan wynne
gomelwudu grétte· hwílum gyd áwræc
sóð ond sárlíc· hwílum syllíc spell
rehte æfter rihte rúmheort cyning·

— Beowulf, lines 2105–10
Translation:

there was song and glee: old Scylding
who has heard tell of many things, from long ago narrated;
at times this battle-daring one the harp for pleasure
the old-wood played; sometimes recited a song,
true and tragic; sometimes strange tales
he related rightly, the open-hearted king

Bede, relating the story of Cædmon (the "first" English poet), describes how the lyre was passed around during feasts, so that as part of the merriment people could pick it up and sing songs. This is similar to other instruments such as the bagpipes which are also described as being passed around at feasts (Exeter Codex). The songs played on the lyre include Anglo-Saxon epic poetry and it is likely that performances of Beowulf, the Wanderer, Deor, the Seafarer etc., were enacted with the lyre providing the backing track.

== Lyre in continental Europe ==
=== Gallery of Germanic lyres ===
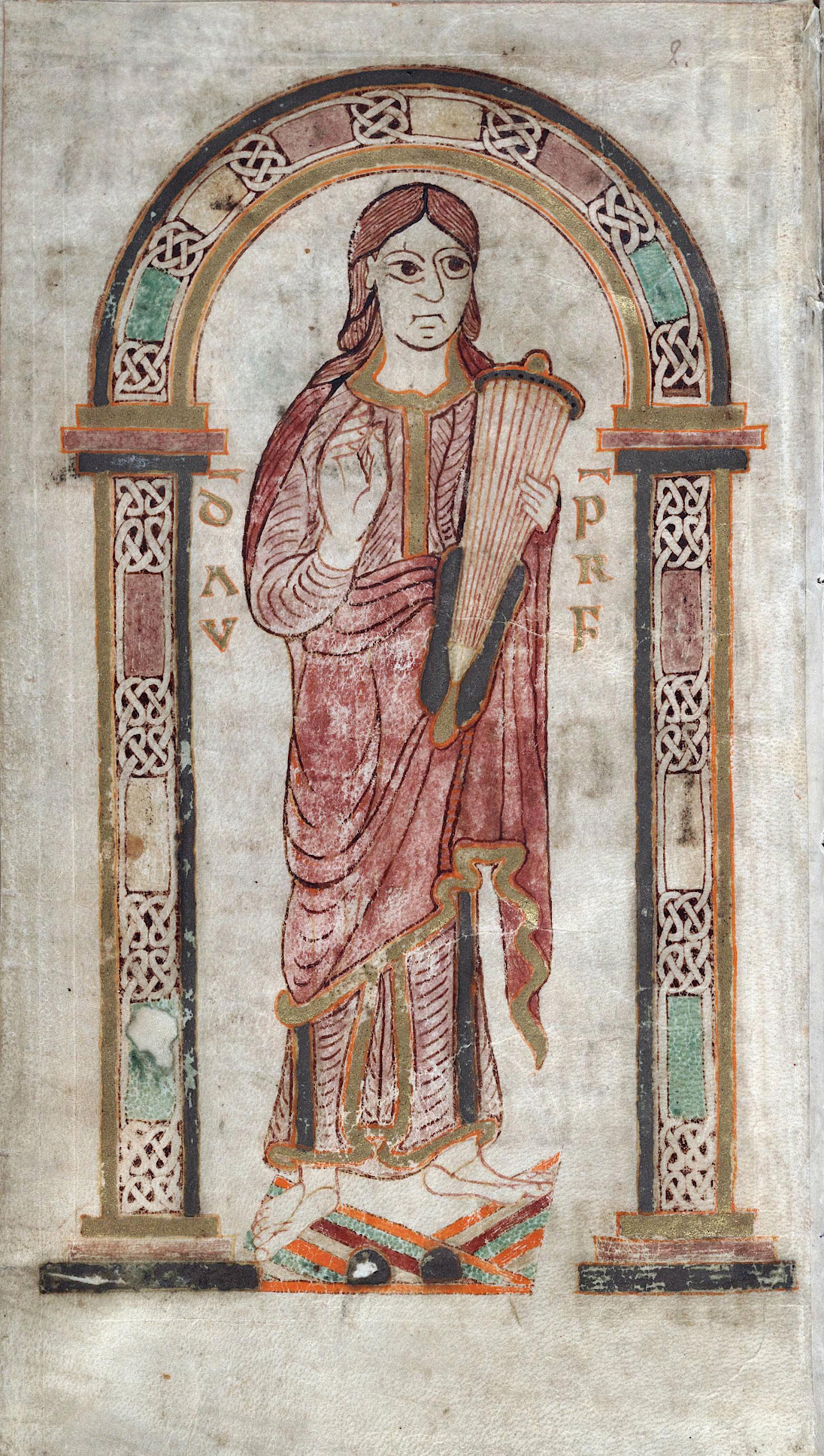
Before 788 A.D., Mondsee Abbey, Austria. David playing a Germanic lyre (or possibly a lyre-shaped psaltery). Montpellier Psalter, also known as the Tassilo Psalter. The instrument has a tailpiece and 10 strings.

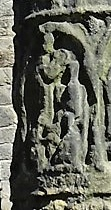
9th century A.D., Yorkshire. David playing Germanic lyre, Masham Column (Anglo-Saxon Cross Shaft, St Mary the Virgin Church, Masham).

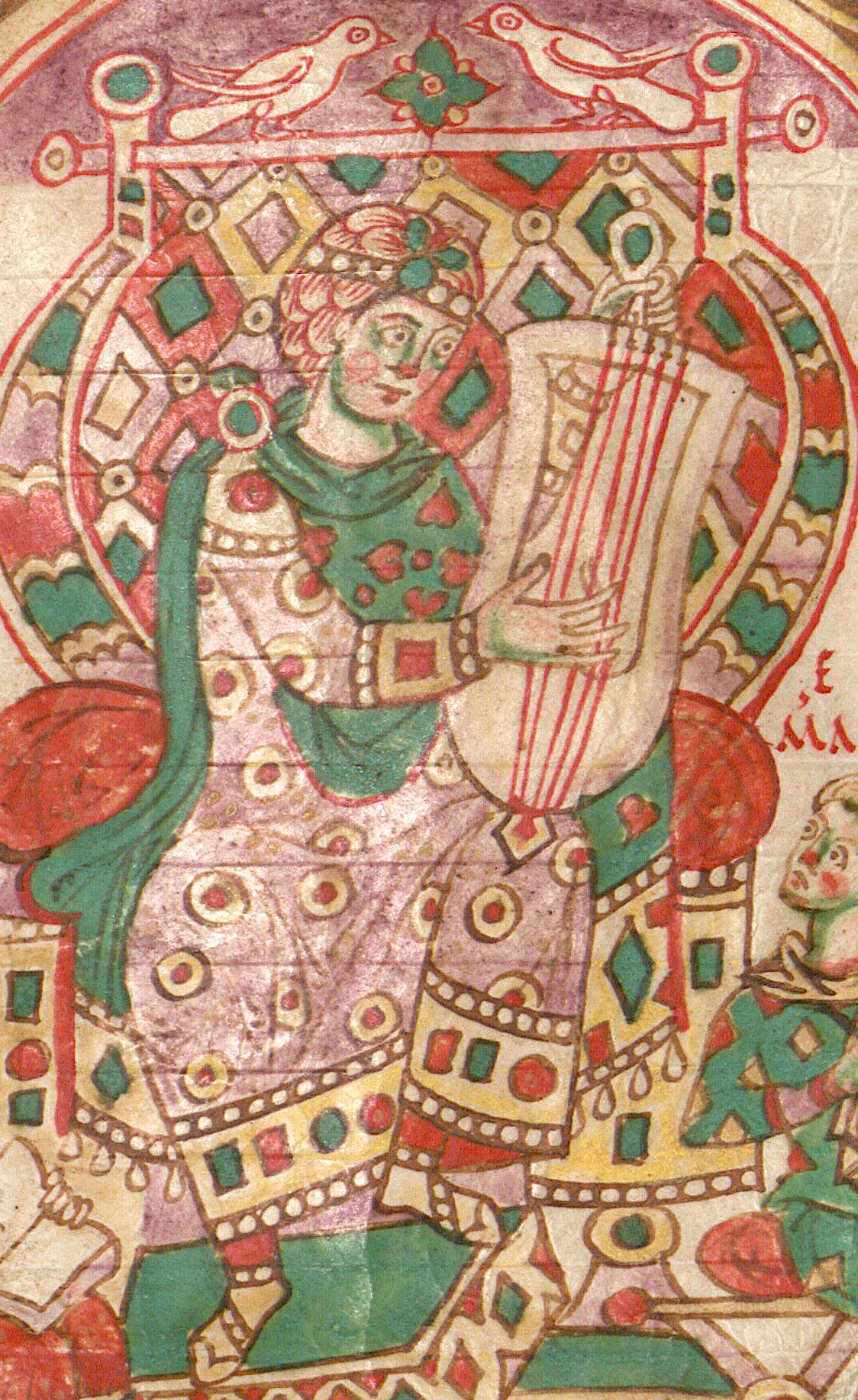
Circa 966-1000 A.D., Milan. David playing lyre, from the manuscript München, Bayerische Staatsbibliothek, Clm 343

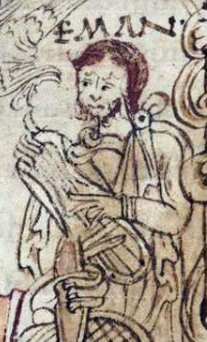
1025-1050 A.D., England. Heman playing rotte, Winchcombe Psalter, Cambridge University Library, Ff.1.23, folio 4v

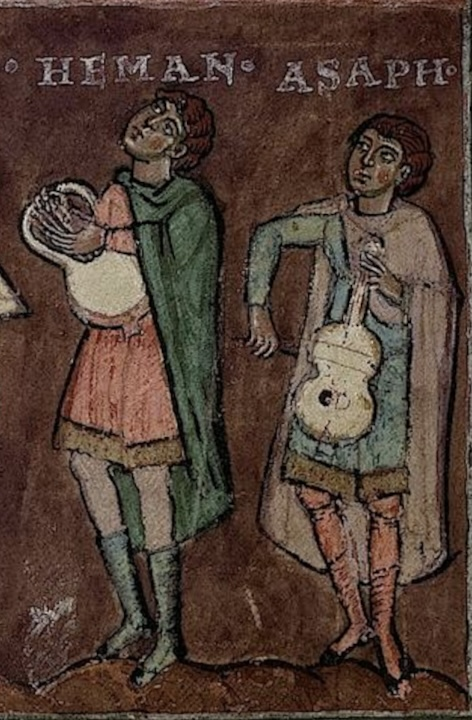
1050 A.D., Germany. Heman playing rotte and Asap playing rabel. Heidelberg Psalter.

Harpa, Scandinavian lyre, Hylestad Stave Church in Norway, late 12th-early 13th century A.D. Beneath brige is possible bar tailpiece (anchored to bottom of lyre).

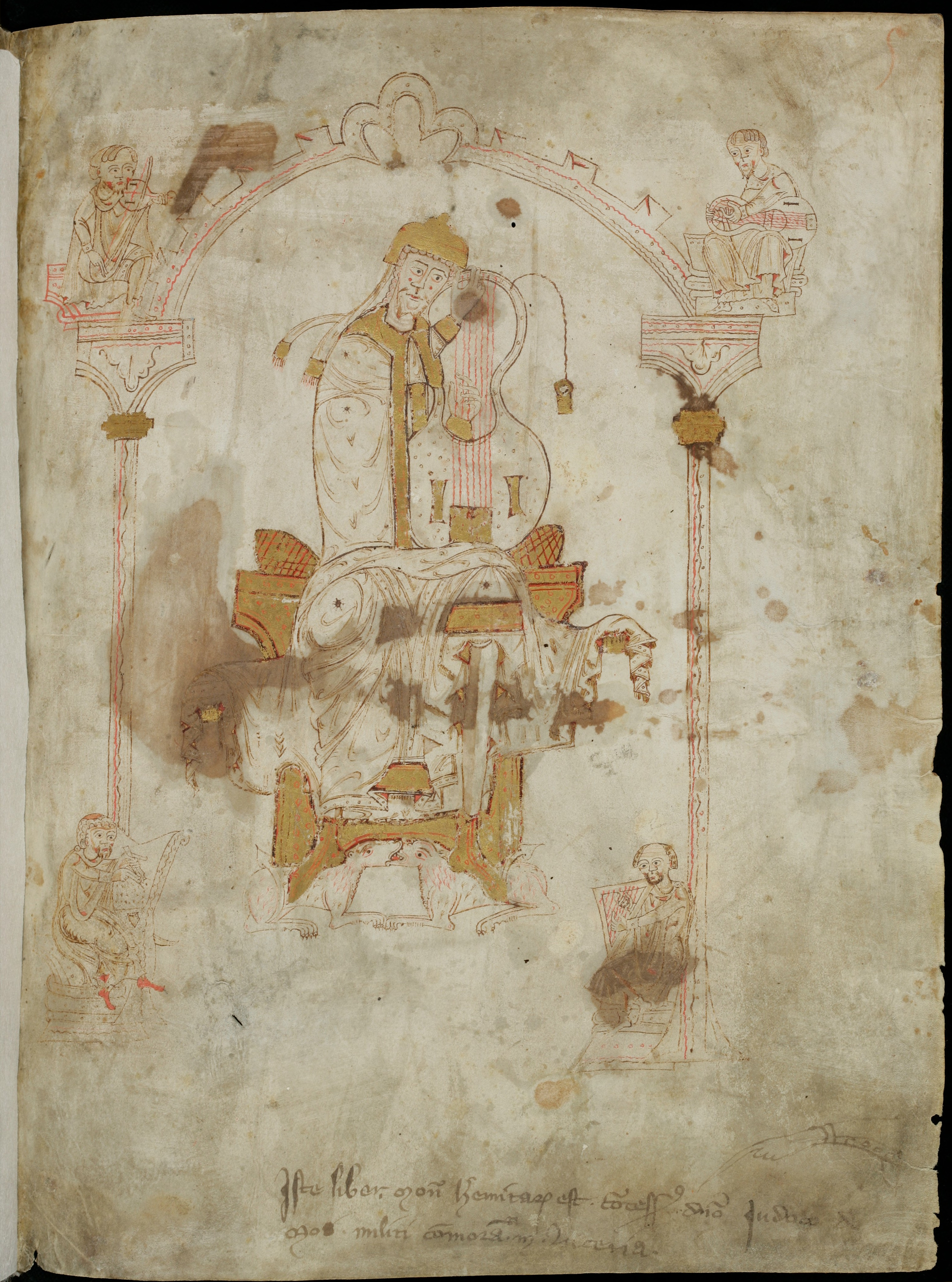
12th century A.D., Abbey of Saint Gall, Switzerland. David playing rotte, with musicians playing rotte, vielle and harp, and one scribe writing a manuscript. Instrument-names on following page: psalterium, rotta and cithara.

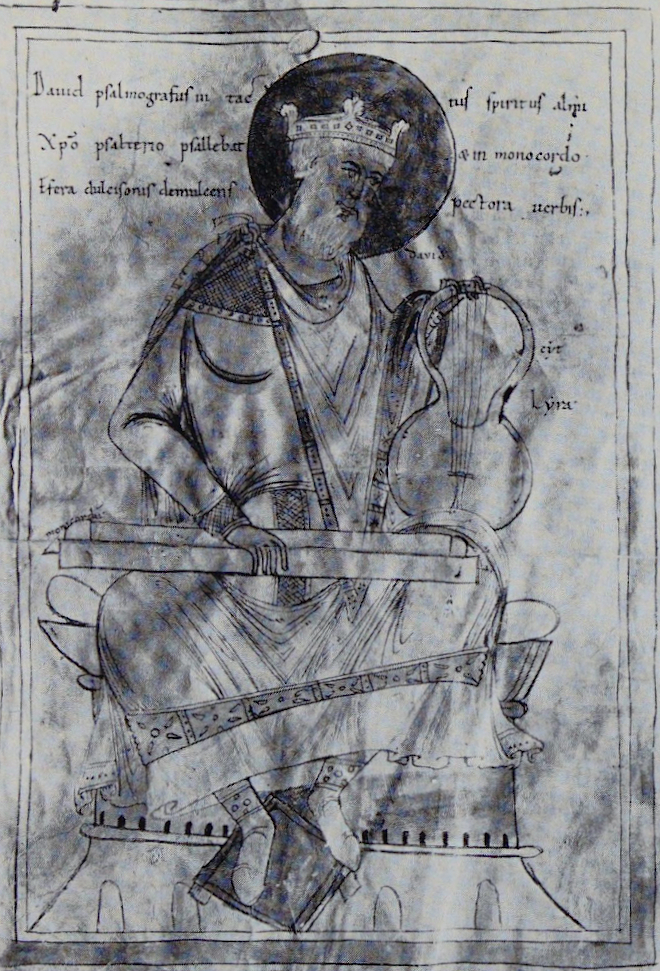
11th-12th century, Germany. King David with monochord and "lyra", from Koblenz, Staatsarchiv, HS 101, NR 110, f 153.

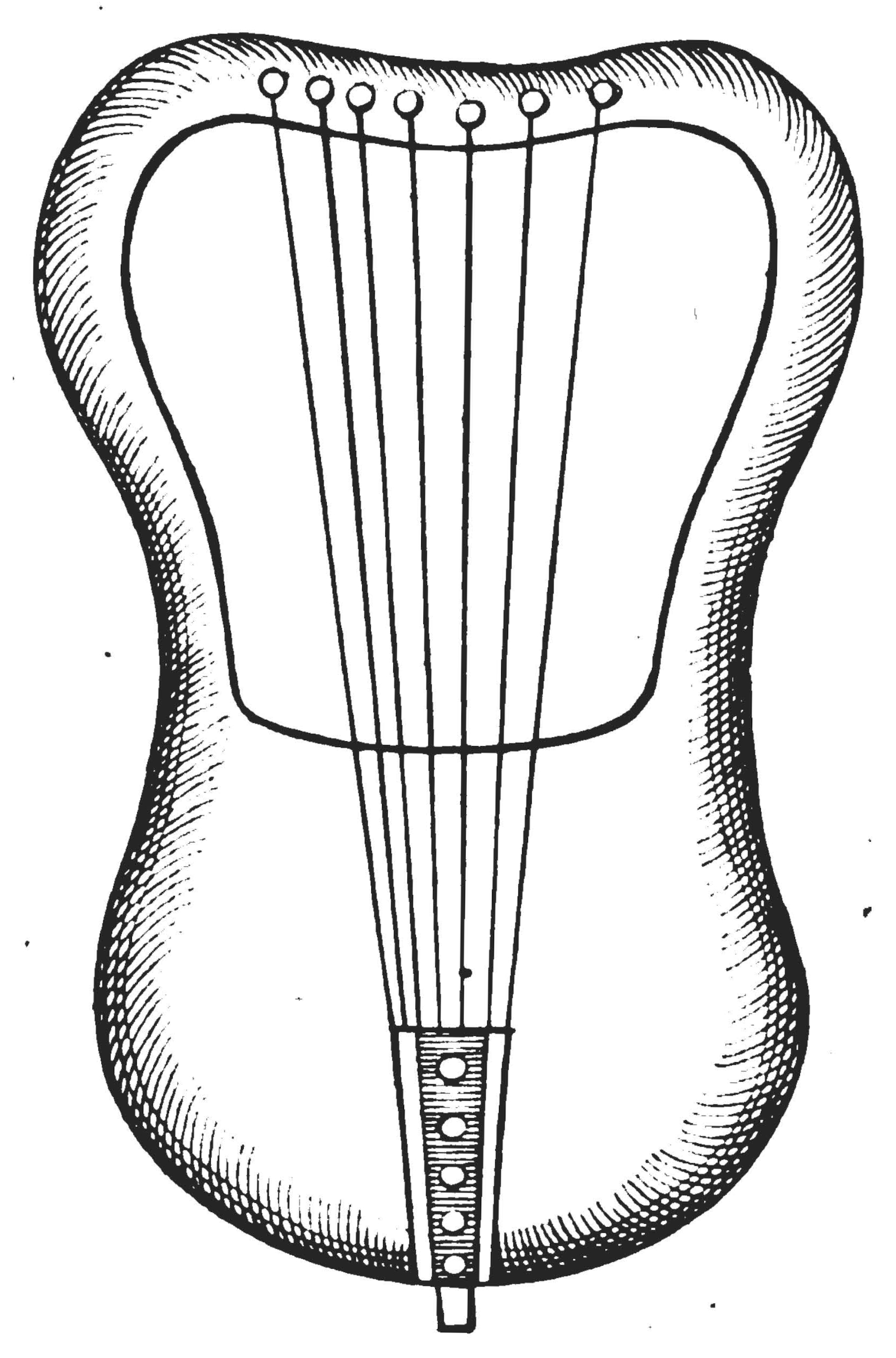
12th century, Germany. Engraving from 1774 that copied instrument in a manuscript lost in a fire. Labeled "Cythara Teutonica" by Martin Gerbert. Original manuscript mislabeled 9th century by Carl Engel.

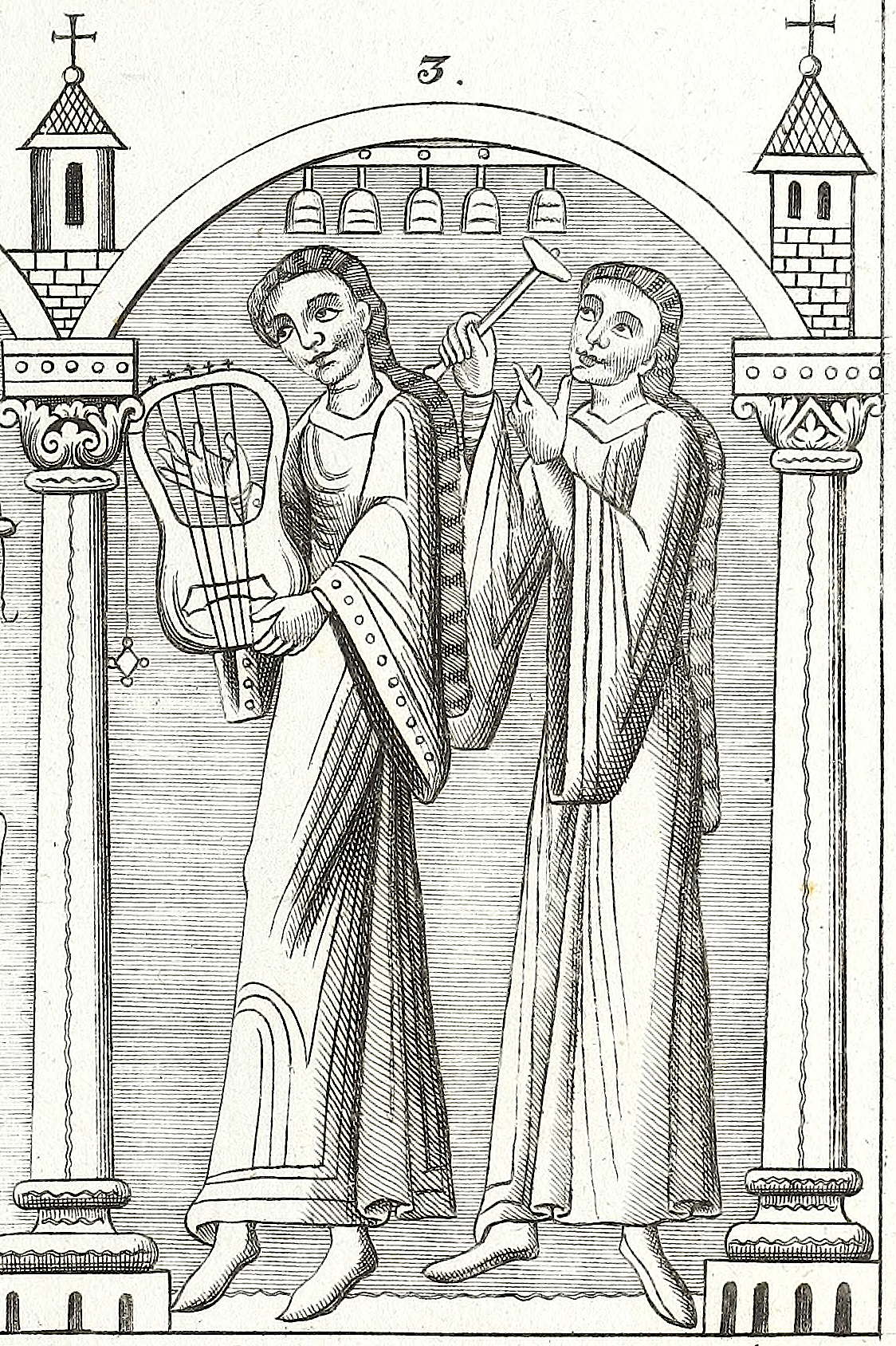
Image of musicians with the "Cythara Teutonica" and cymbala from the 1774 book De Cantu et musica sacra by Martin Gerbert. Gerbert copied the round Germanic lyre from a 12th century A.D. manuscript.

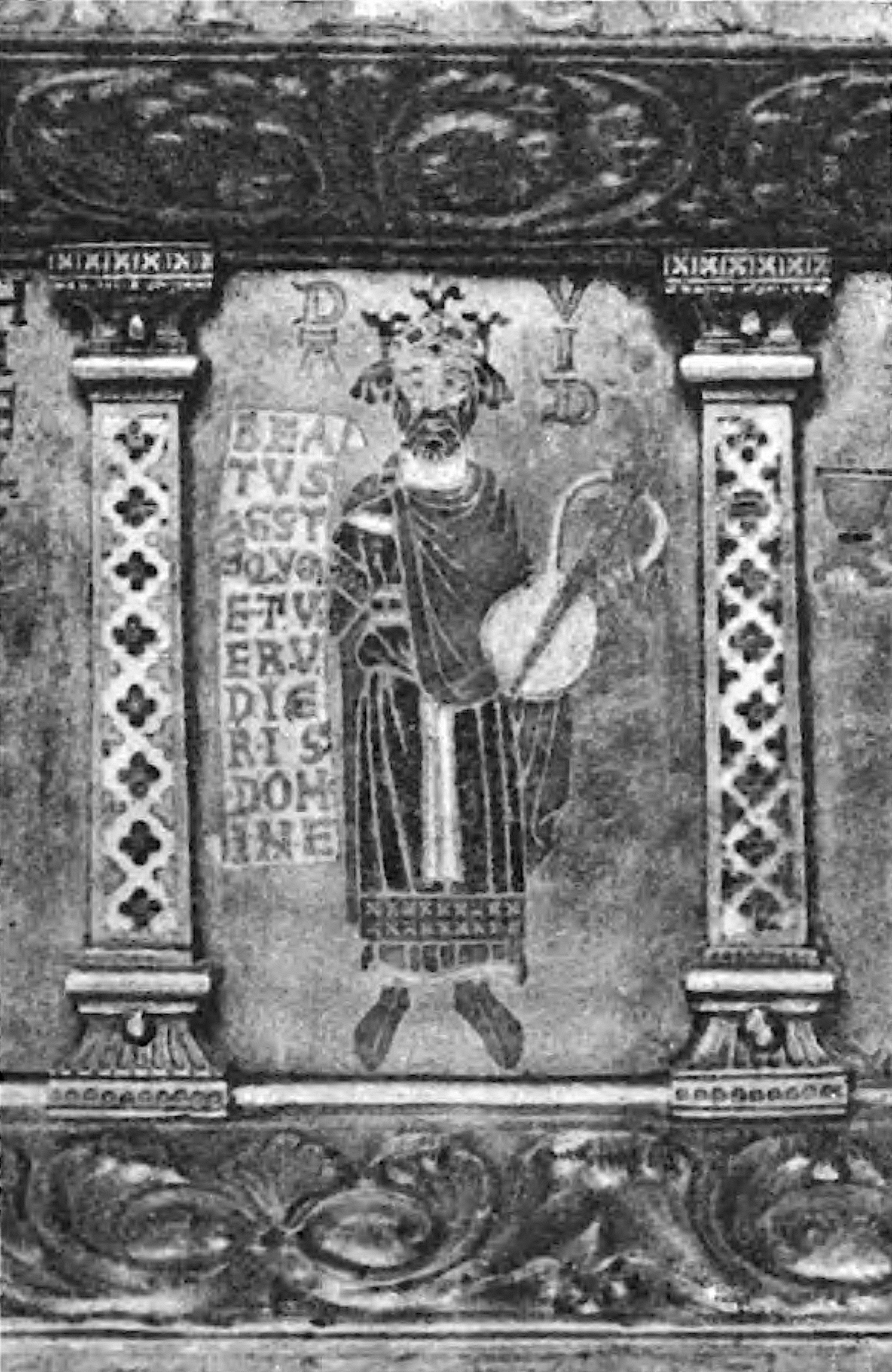
German round lyre, from manuscript, 12th century Vienna

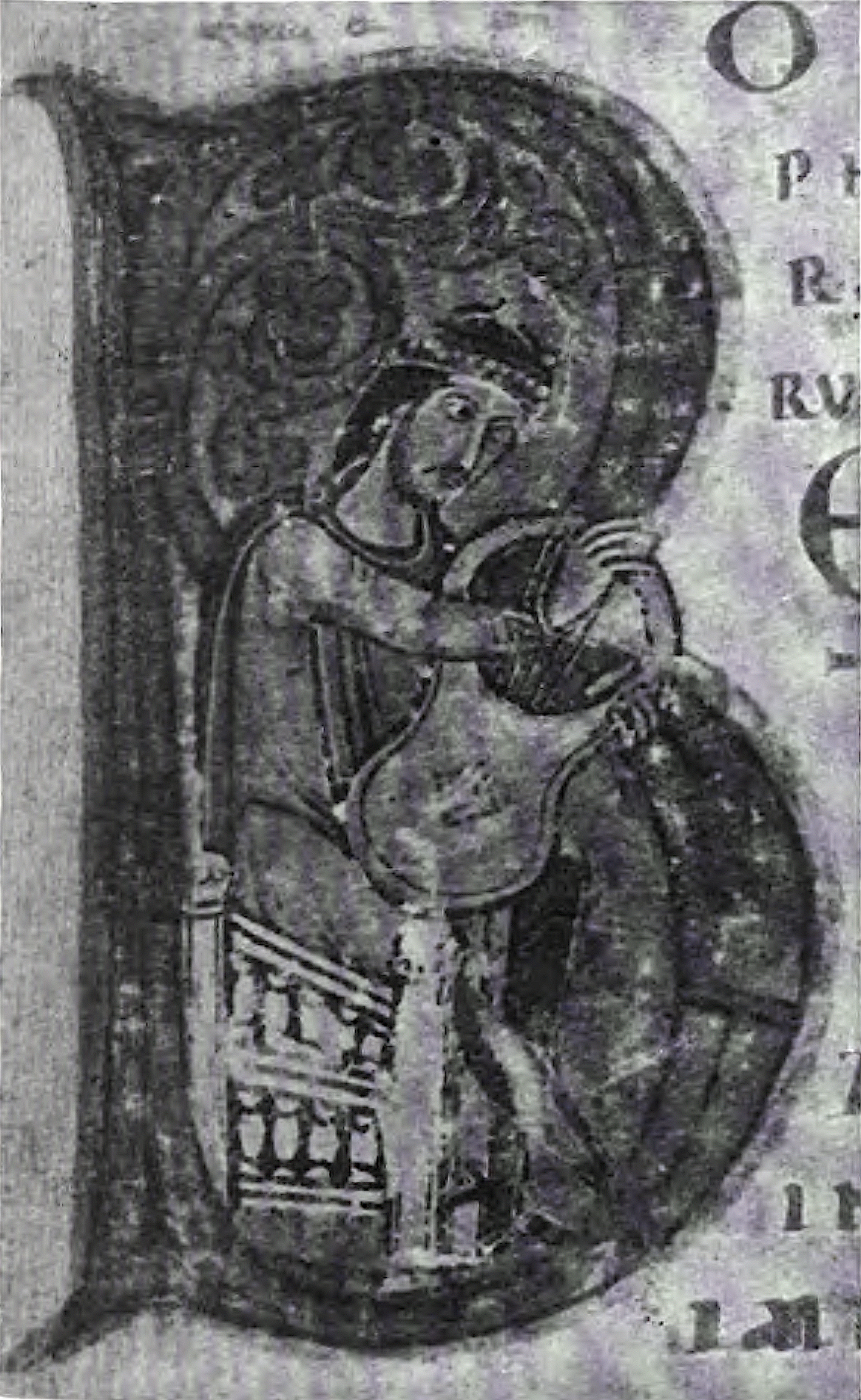
German round lyre, from manuscript, 12th century Munich

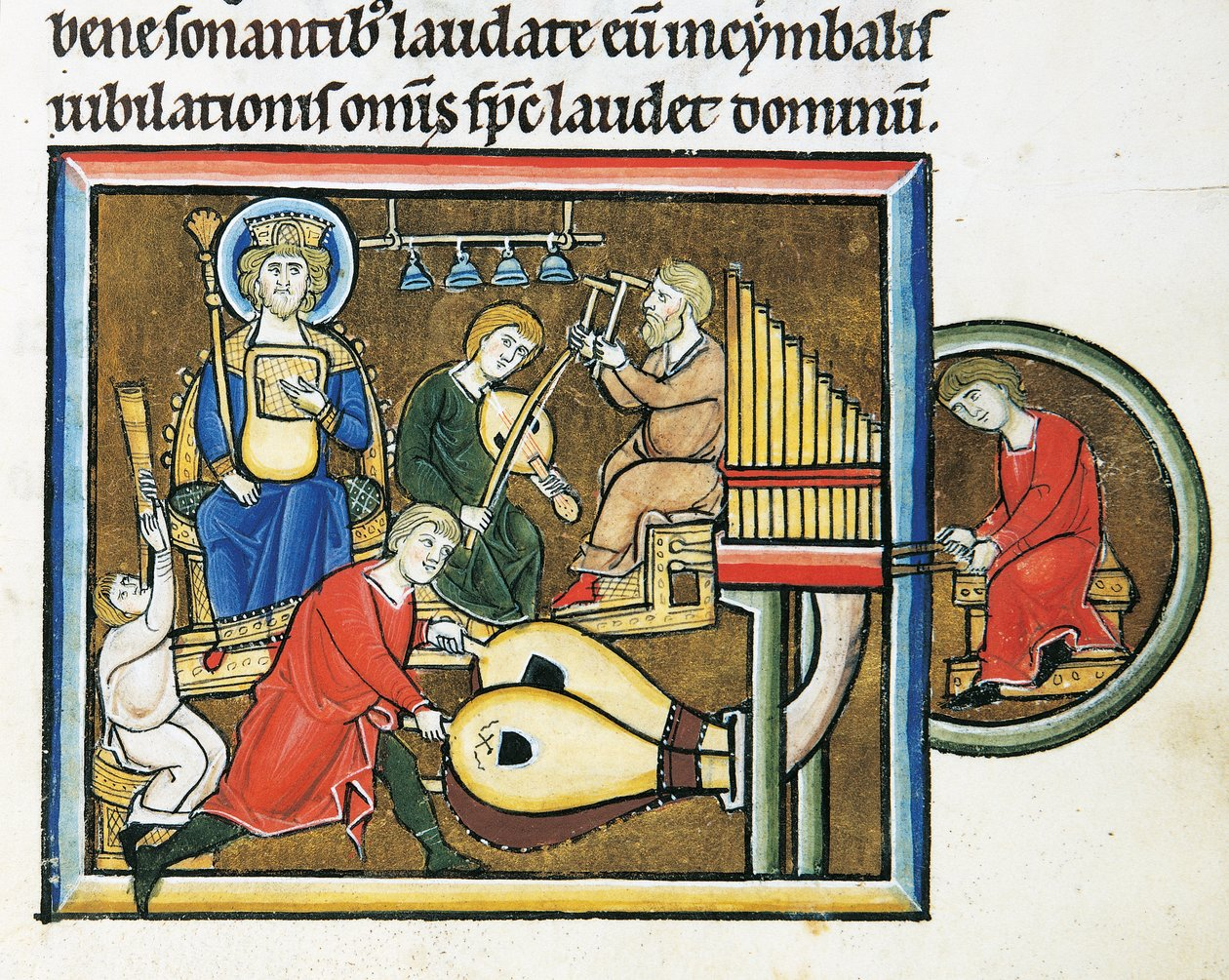
Early 13th century, Germany, St. Elizabeth's Psalter. King David holding a smaller rotte.

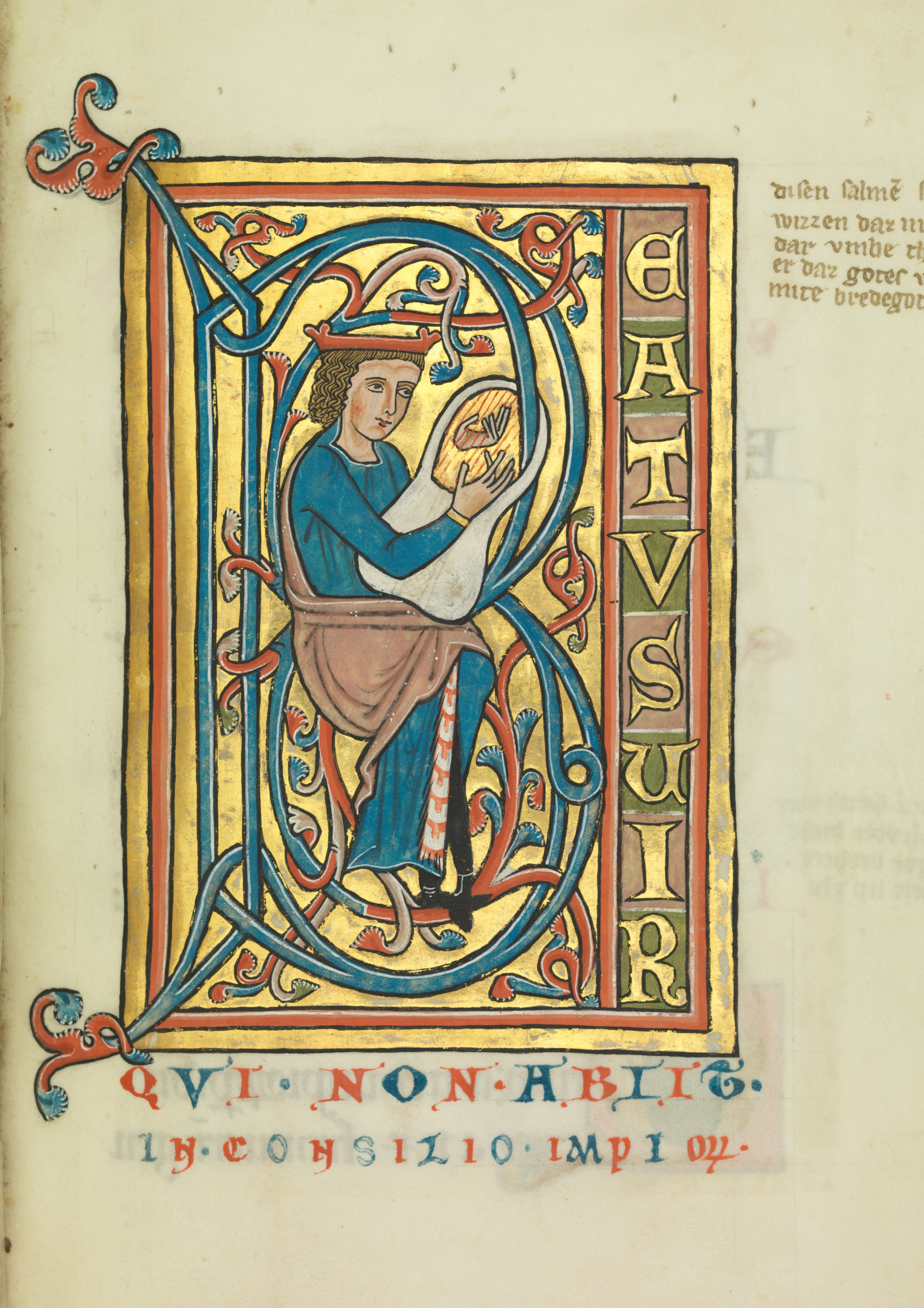
David playing a Germanic lyre. Psalter (Gallican). Augsburg, 1240-1260. Chester Beatty Library W 040, f.7r

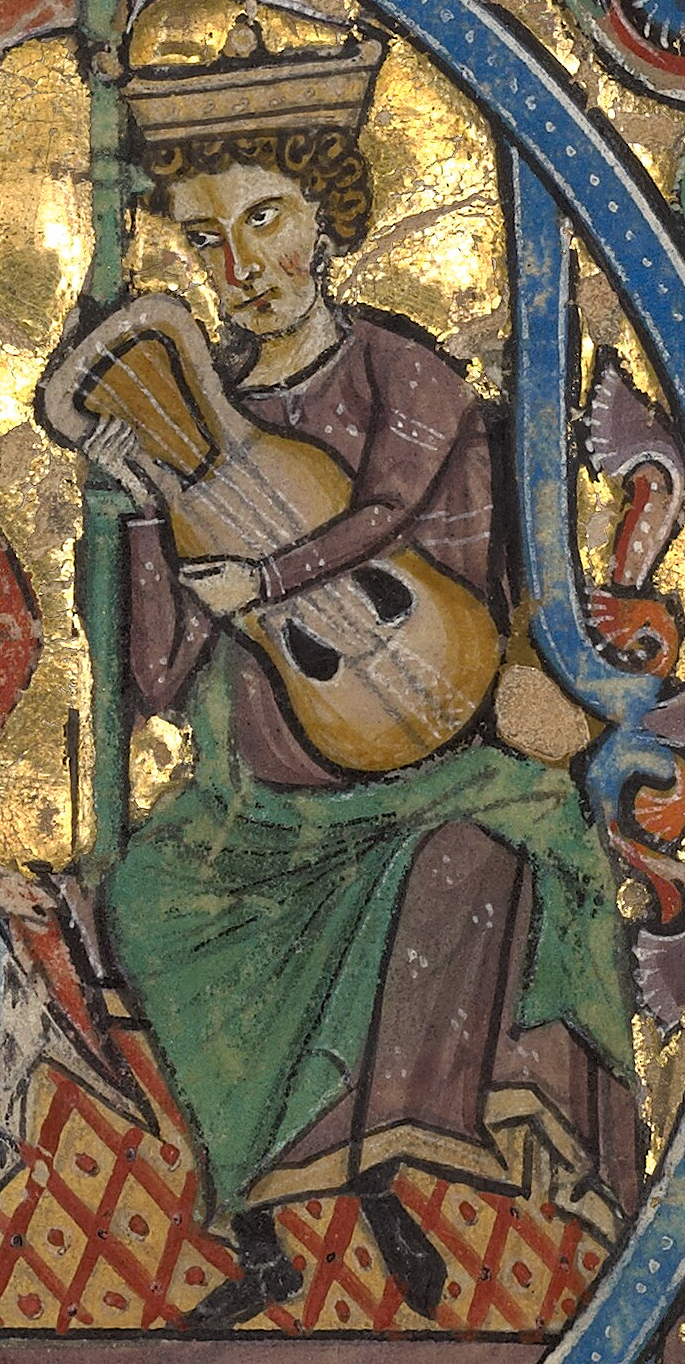
Circa 1240-1250, Wurzburg, Germany. Musician with rotte, from Wurzburg Psalter, Ms. Ludwig VIII 2 (83.MK.93), folio 11, Getty Museum.

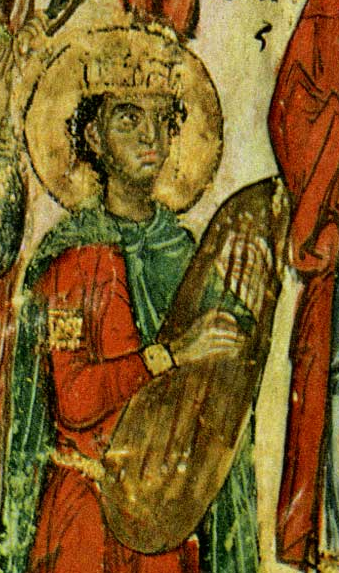
13th century, Russia. Man playing a gusli or rotte from the Simonovskaya Psalter. Playing holes would get smaller as the instrument became a lap-played psaltery.

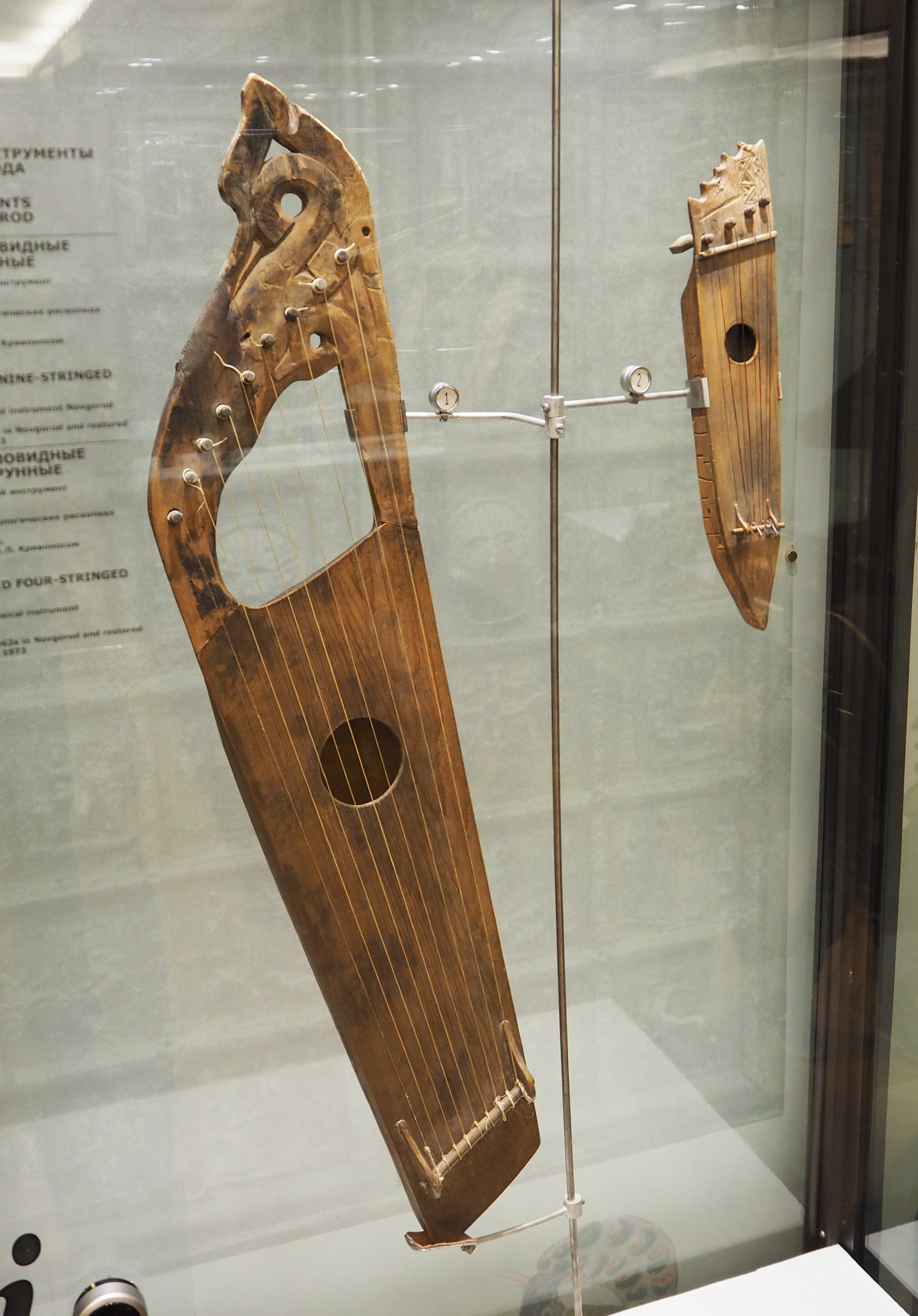
Russia. Left, 9-string gusli, 13th century. Right, 4-string gusli, 14th century.

== Norse lyre ==
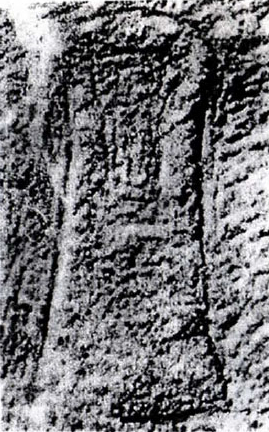
Gotland lyre, rock carving, 6th century

In Old Norse, harpa could be used for multiple instruments, including the lyre and the later harp, as can be seen in carved artwork.

The oldest image of the Norse lyre comes from Gotland in Sweden, where a rock carving dating from the 6th century has been interpreted as an image of a lyre.

In the Poetic Edda, the harpa is mentioned in several different poems.

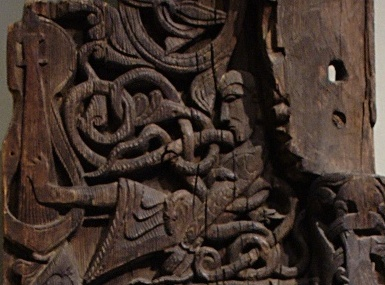
Late 12th-early 13th century, Hylestad Stave Church, Norway. Gunther, imprisoned in a snakepit uses his toes to play an upside down lyre.

A Norse story about Gunnar that was widely known was source material for Icelandic poetry. In the story, Gunnar lay dying, thrown into a pit of snakes. He had given his sister in marriage to Atli, and wanted Atli's sister Oddrun for his own wife. Atli refused, but Oddrun and Gunnar slept together anyway. Atli had Gunnar killed in the snakepit, and (pleading to his sister Gunnar or his lover Oddrun for help) Gunnar played his harpa with his toes (his hands were tied). The harpa is used this way in the Dráp Niflunga, Oddrúnargrátr, and Atlakviða.

‘Hǫrpu tók Gunnarr, hrœrði ilkvistum;
slá hann svá kunni, at snótir grétu;
klukku þeir karlar, er kunnu gørst heyra;
ríkri ráð sagði — raptar sundr brustu!

— The Poetic Edda, The Greenlandic Poem of Atli, line 64 [66]
Translation:

‘Gunnarr took a harp, stirred it with his sole-twigs [toes];
he struck it as he knew how, so that women sobbed;
those men cried out, who could hear it most clearly;
he spoke of his plight to a powerful one [to Guðrún or Oddrún] — rafters burst asunder!

— translated by Edward Pettit

It is also mentioned in the Völuspá.

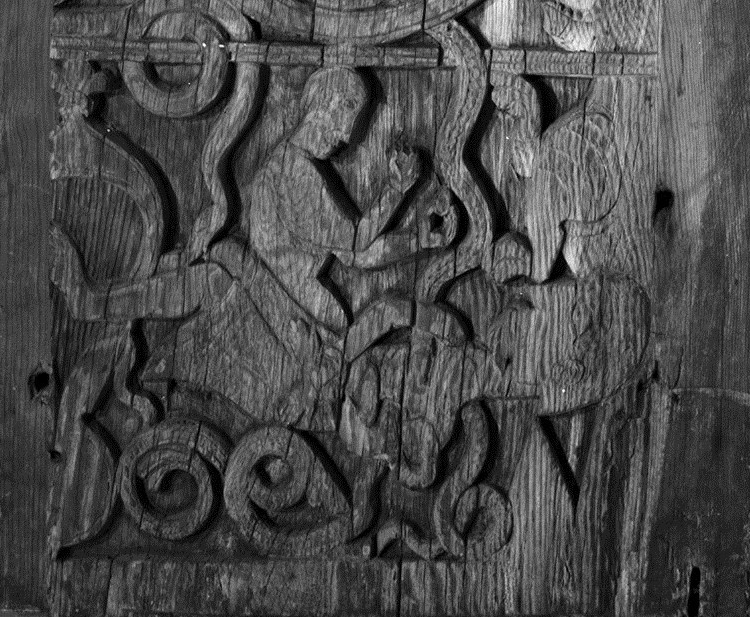
Circa 1200 A.D. Gunnar playing the lyre with his toes, lyre sitting with the top up. Austad stavkirkeportal (Austad Stave Church portal).

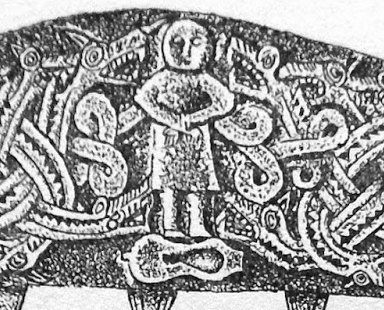
Circa 1200 A.D., Norway. Gunnar with a lyre at his feet, in the snakepit. Artwork decorating chair, originally in Heddal Stave Church.

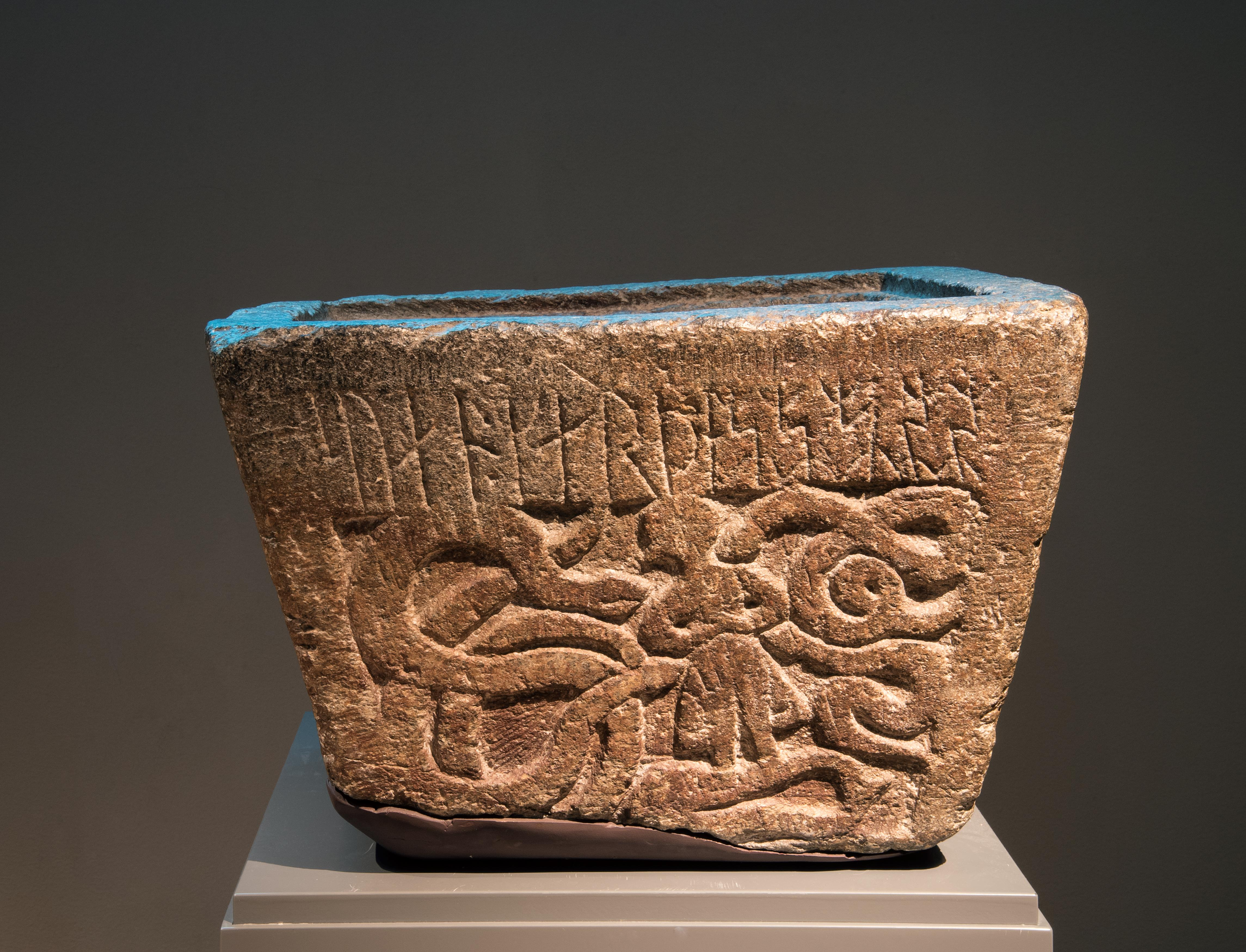
Circa 1125-1175, Sweden. Baptismal font from Norum church, with artwork showing Gunnar in the snakepit, a lyre at his feet.

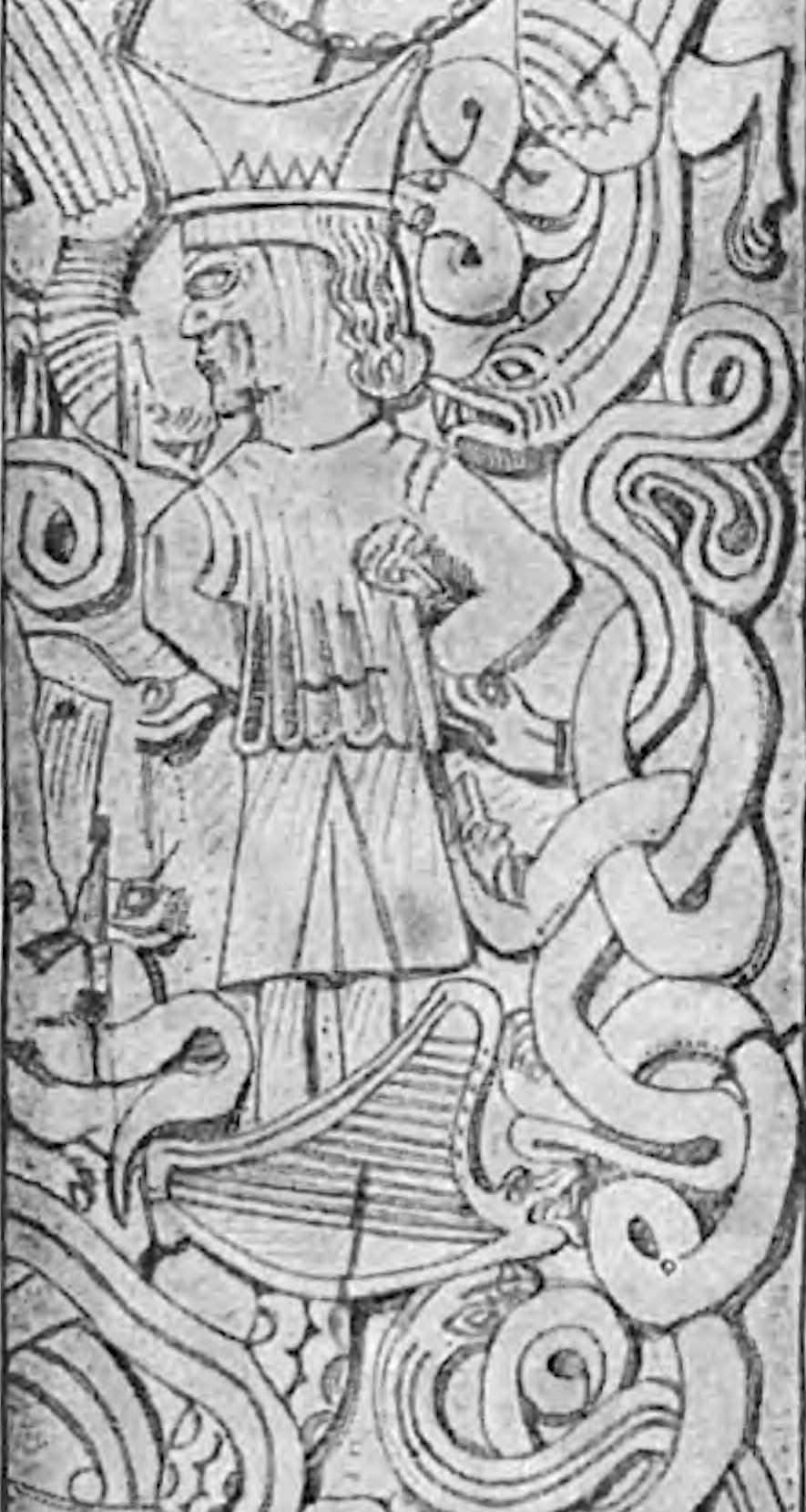
After 1168 A.D. (when the wood was harvested). Uvdal Stave Church, Numedal, Norway. In this image, Gunther's instrument resembles an Irish harp or medieval harp.

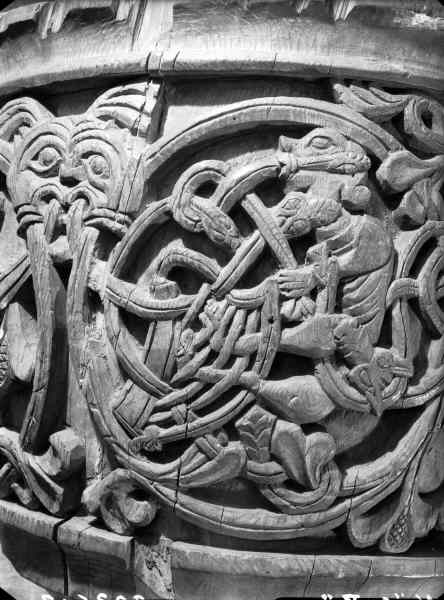
Circa 13th century, Sweden. Gunnar playing the harp, from Näs Church in Jämtland, Sweden.

== Celtic lyre ==
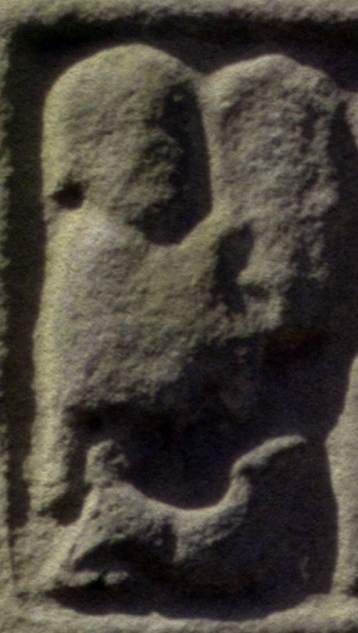
8th-9th century A.D., Abbey of Kells, Ireland. Musician (possibly David) playing a round-topped cruit on the Kells West Cross; strings can be seen as a cone shaped bundle.

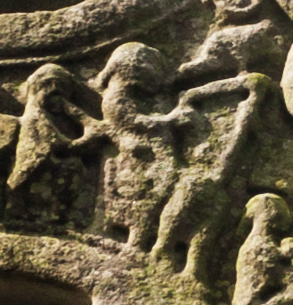
Late 9th-10th century A.D., Ireland. Monasterboice South Cross, East Face. The instrument has been interpreted both as a harp and as an asymmetrical lyre.

In Ireland, patriotism has claimed the Celtic harp as an Irish symbol, in spite of scholarship which acknowledges the cruit to originally have been a form of lyre. This disconnect was commented on as early as 1910. Looking broadly at both Ireland and Scotland early images of stringed instruments may be seen in carved reliefs on stone crosses and in a manuscript illustration. The earliest images of European harps are found in Scotland, in Pictish relief carvings.

Irish relief artwork shows lyres (or quadrangular stringed-instruments) with soundboards and bridges. Telling the difference between a harp and a lyre in these images may be problematic because they are badly eroded. Should they show a bridge, they may be clearly labeled lyre. Three styles of lyre are seen on the stone crosses: round topped instruments, instruments with one straight and one curved arm, and asymmetrical (or oblique) instruments.

In Irish, the instruments were called cruit or crot and timpán. The cruit initially seems to have referred to a lyre. Later in the 8th-10th century A.D., when triangular (or "trilateral") harps appeared, the word cruit would apply to them as well. Once the name for a lyre, cruit would come to apply to smaller harps, while larger harps would be called cláirseach.

The timpán was "probably" a lyre with a willow body and three metal strings, played using "a long fingernail or plectrum" by musicians of lesser status than the professional cruitire (bards). It became a bowed instrument, the crwth, "after the early 11th century" or by the 12th century. Used to accompany "Fenian epics and praise poetry."

Over time, researchers have interpreted artwork differently; an example is the instrument on the Monasterboice South Cross, which has been called both harp and lyre. Both types of instruments would be illustrated in the religious reliefs on the Irish and Scottish High Crosses.

An Iron Age era bridge found in the Isle of Skye is currently the earliest known piece of a European stringed-instrument, dating to about 500-450 B.C.

=== Science may not be settled, Celtic versus German lyres ===
Irish — German interactions

The Germanic tribes became widespread in Europe during the Migration Period, about 300-600 A.D., about the same time that Christianity spread across Europe. Christian control from the Roman Empire ended with the new German control (see Diocese of Gaul). Then the Irish mounted their own invasion; having been Christianized in the 5th century, Irish Christians evangelized in England and Continental Europe in the 6th and 7th centuries A.D.

According to linguist Hugo Steger in his 1971 book Philologia Musica, one needs to be careful not to assume that the Germanic rotte lyres are the same as the Irish instruments. His linguistics observations are used by the current Old High German Dictionary (the Althochdeutsches Wörterbuch) to make sense of rotta, rotte and whether these are related to crwth.

M. Bruce-Mitford, who wrote the section for the rotte in the New Grove Dictionary of Musical Instruments in 1984, assumed that "the Celtic ‘crwth’, ‘cruit’, and ‘crot’, English ‘rote’ and ‘crowd’, French ‘rote’ and German ‘rotte’ are obviously related etymologically."

Steger used linguistics to arrive at a different conclusion. His estimation is that one set of words came from a Germanic language (probably Old Frankish), and that at a later time, crwth entered French from Irish. He estimated that the instruments each language referred to may not be the same, nor the German and Irish words. He wrote that confusion has resulted from writers assuming that words which looked similar must be related; these writers had examined the words in the past without the benefit of modern linguistics knowledge.

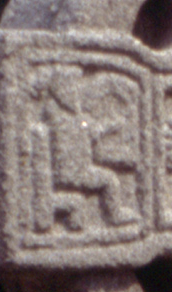
Musician playing cruit, Castledermot early monastery, South Cross. The earlier monastery was founded circa 812 A.D., ending about 1073 A.D. Round top lyre.

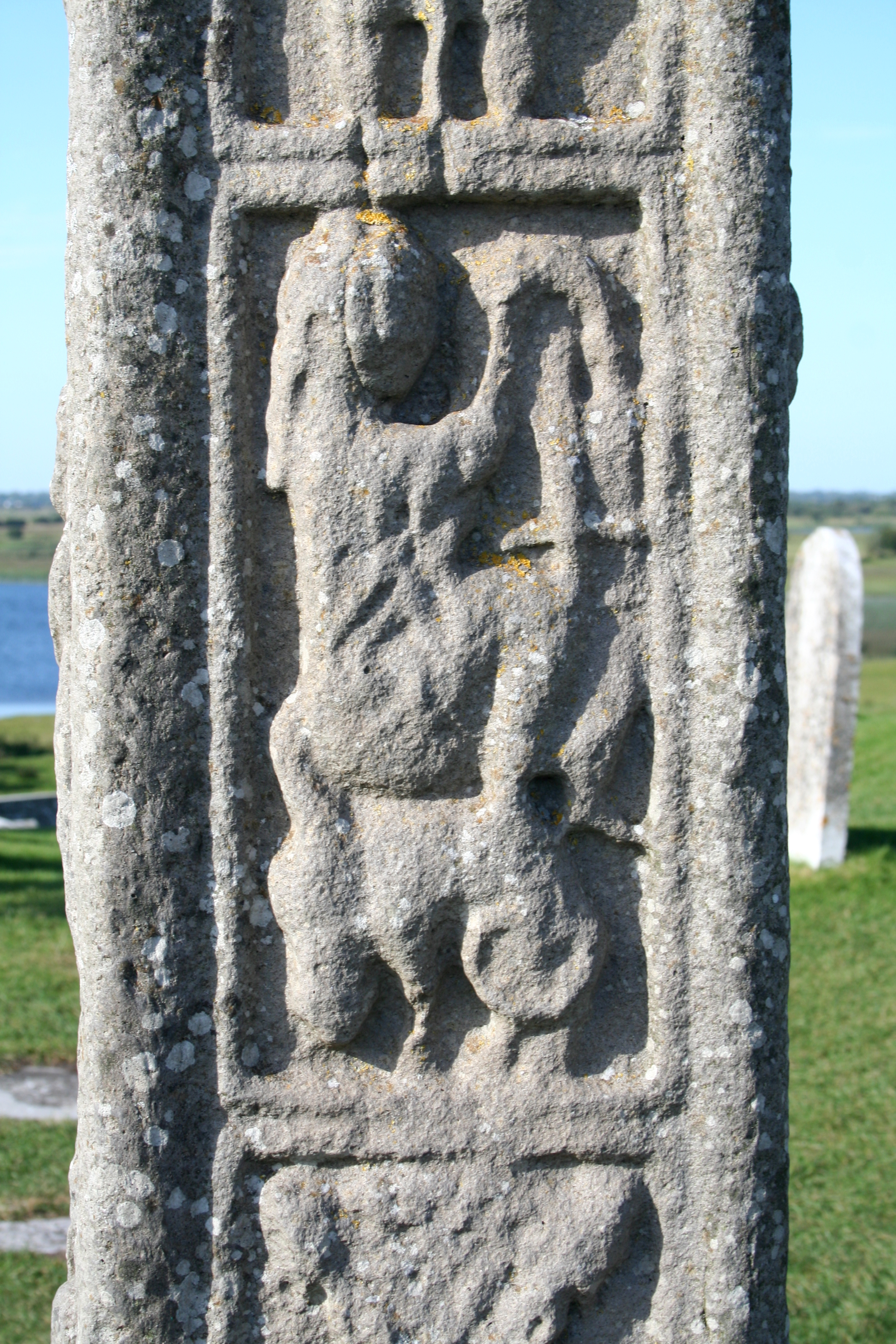
Replica of lyre player on Clonmacnoise Cross of Scriptures, south west view. Image shows round top, and the bundle of strings.

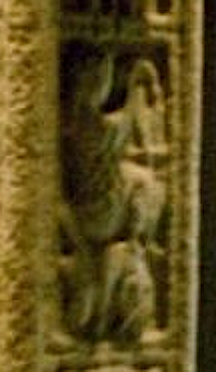
Circa 900 A.D. Original of the Clonmacnois Cross of Scriptures, south west view. Shows arch at top and string bundle.

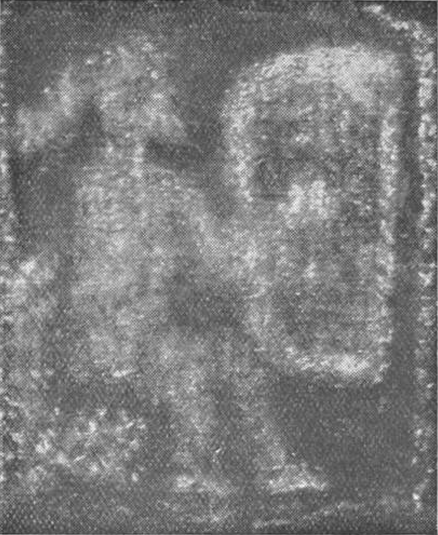
Musician playing "quadrangular" cruit on High Cross, Ullard Church, County Kilkenny, Ireland; rubbing on fabric by Galpin. One straight and one curved arm.

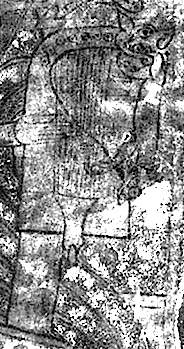
10th century manuscript image showing cruit. Ms. Cotton Vitellius F xi, folio 2r. Infrared photograph of page burned in fire. Lyre built in style of one straight and one curved arm.

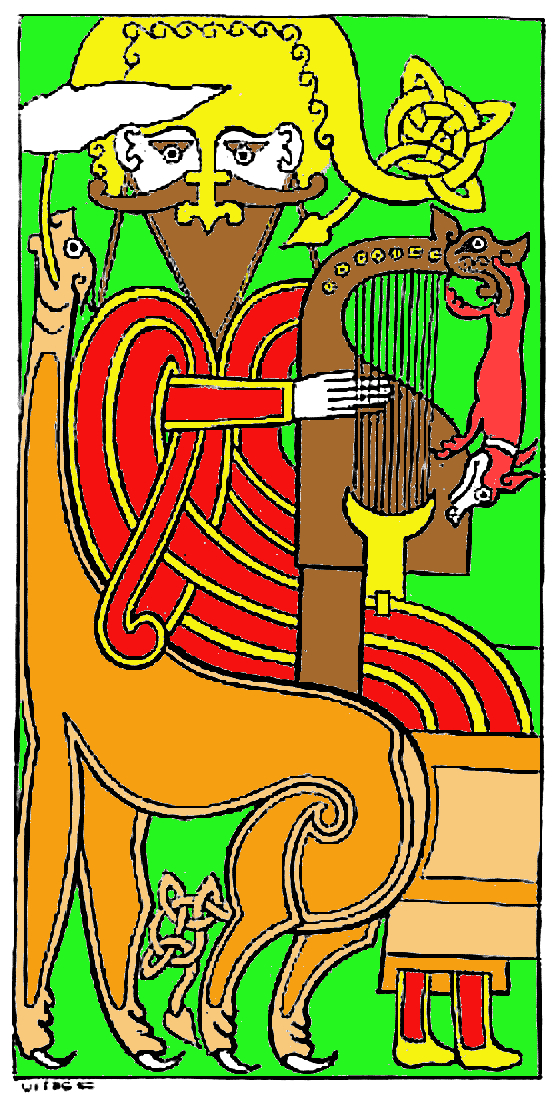
Cotton Vitellius F xi, folio 2r, redrawn in 1850. Colorized digitally. Image shows some lyres had a forepost (the dog) added to the lyre's arch, creating the not-quite symmetrical shape in some depictions.

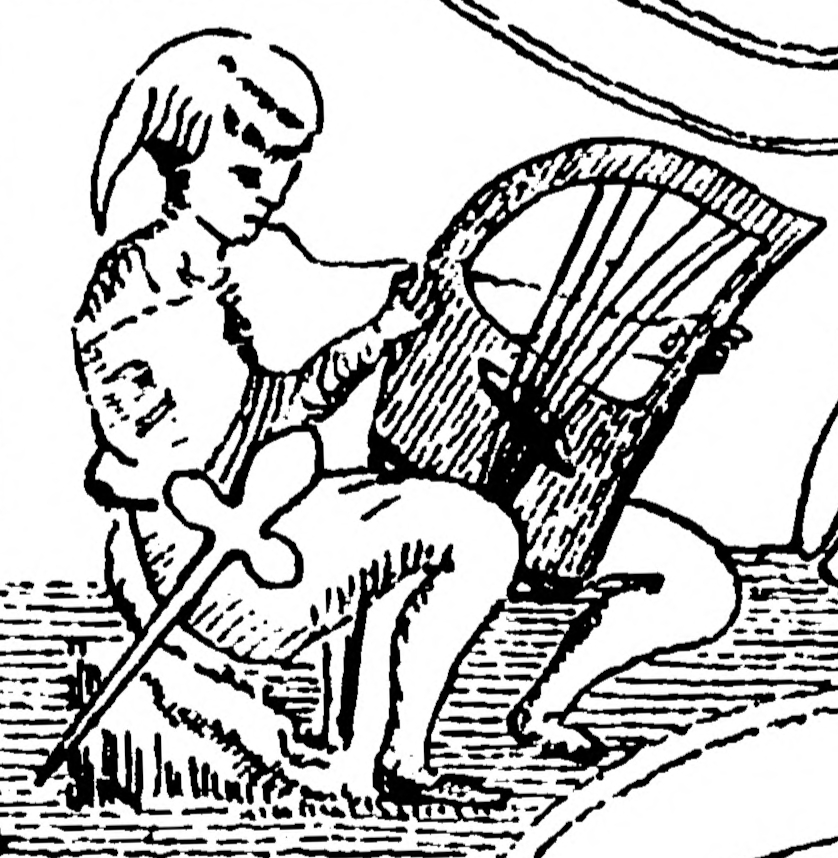
Mid-9th century A.D., Ireland (1895 illustration). Durrow Cross lyre. In some photos of this cross, the bridge is clearly visible. One curved arm, one strait arm.

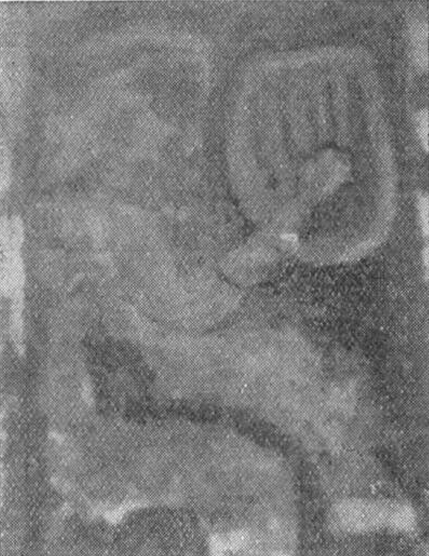
Rubbing of a section of the Castledermot, North Cross, showing a musician playing a cruit.

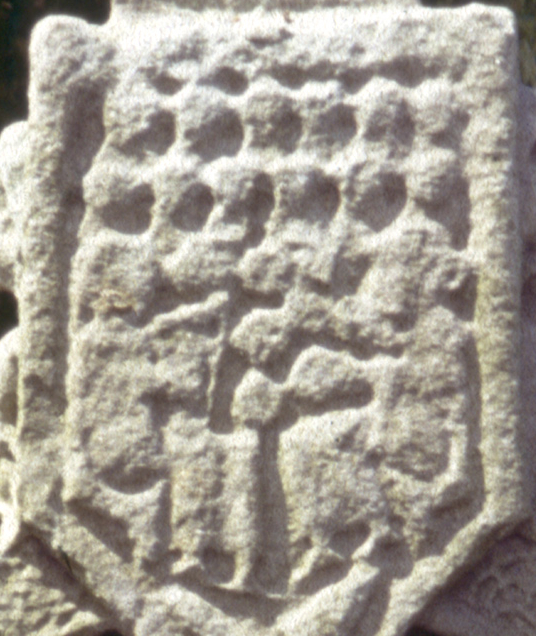
Kells South Cross. Asymmetrical lyre (accompanied by musicians playing double or triple pipes).

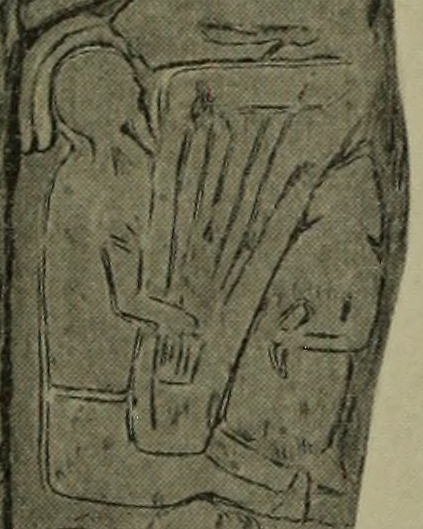
11th century A.D., Isle of Man. Lyre player. Manx runestones, the Mal Lumkun Cross, (also known as the Br Olsen;215 (Kirk Michael (III), MM 130). Asymmetrical lyre.

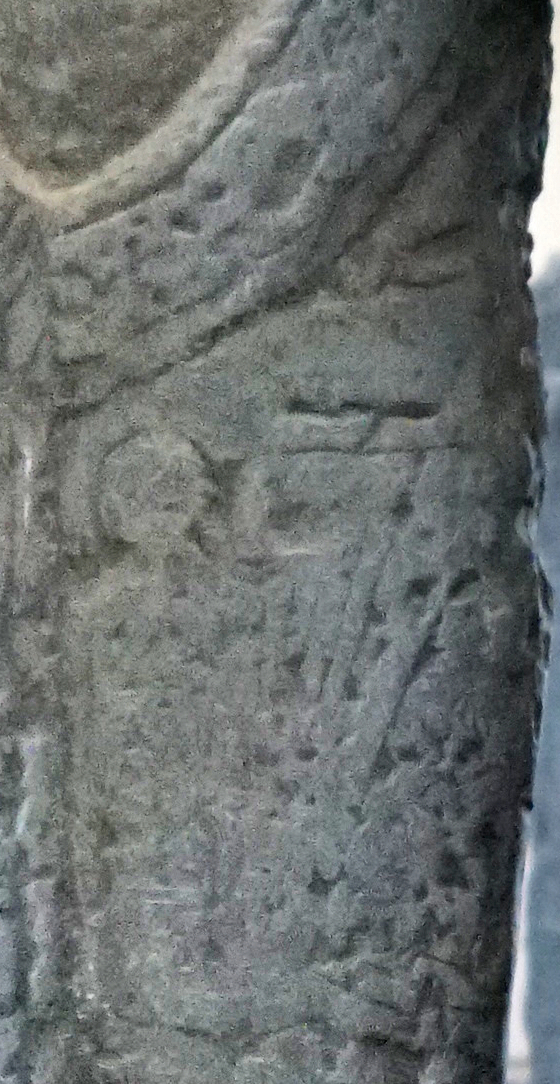
Lyre player, Mal Lumkun Cross, digital photo, adjusted to bring out detail. Stag sitting on top of lyre, his nose toward player and horns broken off, his tail behind the player's head.

== Naming the lyre ==
What one man calls a harp,
another calls a lyre.

— Sebastian Virdung, Musica getutscht, 1511.

There isn't a firm consensus on the origins of the name rotte or rotta. That it was used in the 12th century and earlier to describe a lyre was made clear in the letter of a 12th-century scribe, who complained that the common name for the German lyre, rotta, was being applied the triangular psaltery.

Variants of the word were used for different plucked and bowed string instruments, including the rote fiddle, the rotta psaltery and the rotte lyre. The word dropped out of wide use as instruments changed. Possibly the words was more widely used in some locations, such as the British Isles than in continental Europe.

One researcher said that "It is unclear exactly which instrument was called rotta in the Middle Ages...several forms of the word rotta were used to describe lyre instruments in the British Isles, while in Europe, it was used to describe several different types of instruments, mainly psalteries."

=== Chelys, Tortoise ===
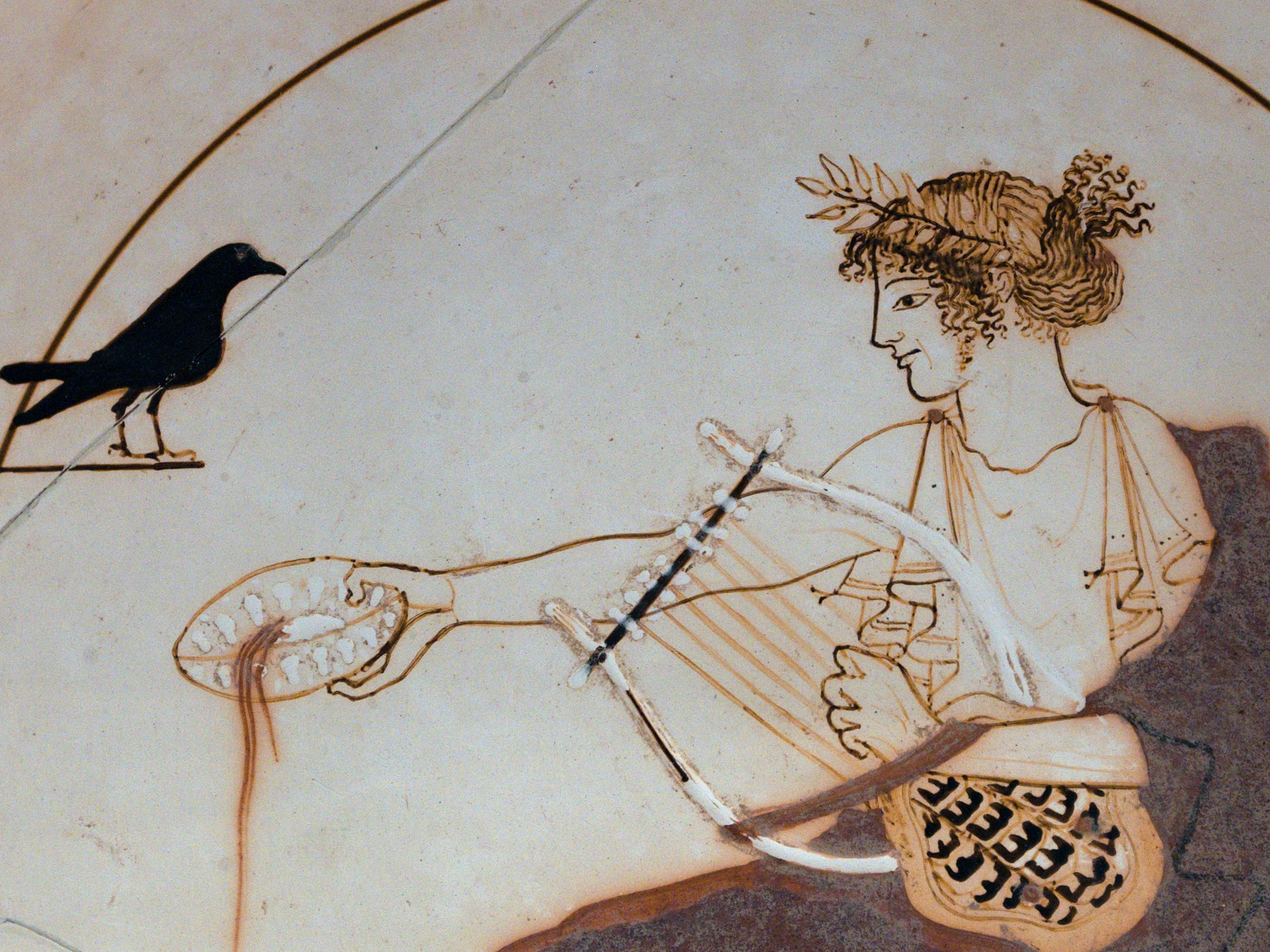
470s B.C., Greece. Apollo with chelys lyre (made from shell of tortoise for a resonator). Rather than being carved from a single block of wood, the Greek lyres were built up, with a bowl resonator, arms and a yoke.

About 60-30 B.C., a historian Diodorus Siculus wrote of the existence of a lyre played by Celtic bards, who used the instrument to accompany their singing songs of praise or trash-talk about others. About 600 years later, those lyres were identified by the Merovingian scholar Venantius Fortunatus (530-609 A.D.) as being called the chrotta.

Chrotta or hrotta was a translation of the Greek word for lyre, chelys, into Old High German. The German and Greek words mean tortoise. Cognates of chrotta include cruð, crot, cruit, crwth, crouth. From these words arose rotte, rota, rote and crowd.

Across northwestern Europe, Celtic and Germanic tribes played a form of lyre whose names appear linguistically related: the Celts called theirs crwth or cruit; to the English the instruments were rote or crowd; the French called theirs rote and the Germans rotte.

This may not be settled; counter arguments concerning the name have been voiced. An instrument called a rote or rotta appears in medieval manuscripts from the 8th to the 16th century, where the name is sometimes applied to illustrations of box-like lyres with straight or waisted sides. Some surviving writings, however, indicate that contemporary writers may have applied the name to the harp. The rote is probably related to the equivalent Irish word cruit and also the Welsh bowed lyre known as the crwth. In these texts the rote clearly applies to a stringed instrument, but it is seldom clear which instrument is meant.

=== Lyre versus harp versus lute ===
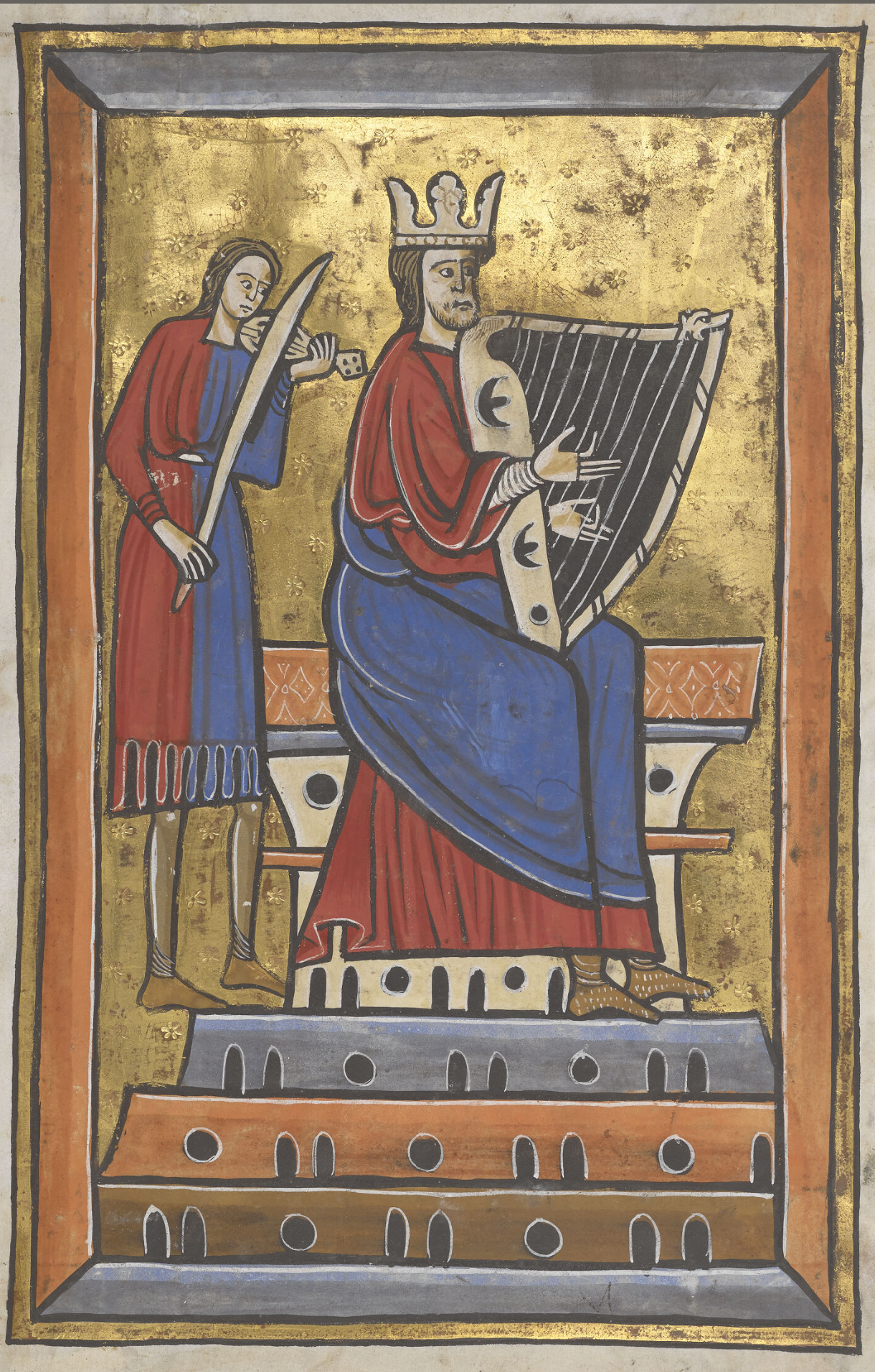
1220 A.D., England. David playing a harp. Behind him, a man plays a bowed lute. The harp's soundbox is vertical, up against the musician, with sound holes on its visible side.

In the Hornbostel-Sachs system of musical instrument classification, both lyres and lutes are closely related, because of the way they are built and the way they produce sound. Both instruments have a string or set of strings that run across a sound table, roughly parallel to it. The strings on both types pass over a bridge that rests upon the sound-table, and press down into it. The vibration of strings as they are played passes through the bridge into the sound table, which also vibrates, exciting the air inside (resonating) and adding to the sound created by the strings. There are differences as well; the lyre tends to have one string assigned to each note that it plays. The player can use the opening at the top of the instrument to allow his fingers to mute strings and create chords. Instead of an opening, a lute has a neck, which the player presses the strings against to create multiple notes for each string; chords are largely produced by holding multiple strings to the neck, rather than muting strings.

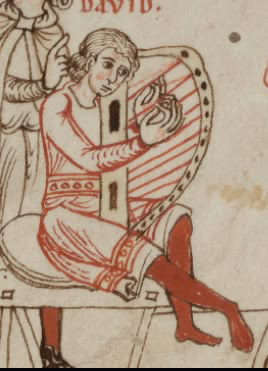
Circa 1180, Germany. David playing a harp. The harp strings here are closer to perpendicular than more commonly portrayed. Possibly experimentation was occurring with building the new instrument, or possibly the artist wasn't familiar with it.

While the lyres and lutes could be brothers in Hornbostel-Sachs, the harp uses a different mechanism to produce sound, putting it into a different family. Harps have strings which run from an arm or the opposite side of a loop to the soundboard. This puts them roughly perpendicular to the sound table, to which they are attached. As the string is played, its vibrations pull and release the surface of the sound table, using it for a resonator. The string sounds — the soundbox resonates. There is no bridge between strings and sound-table.

This way of thinking about the instruments is entirely modern. One way they were classified historically was in the way they were played. This is known because of the names. In Old English the lyre was called hearpe, in old Norse harpa, and in Latin cythara; the words in each meant "to pluck". The Old Irish word crot is an example of another way to classify musical instruments; rather than being for a specific musical instrument, it could signify stringed instruments.

=== Modern names ===
There is no modern universal name for the Germanic lyre, but terms occasionally used include Anglo-Saxon lyre, and Viking lyre or Nordic lyre. All of these names suffer from regional bias, so are not accepted as universal names. The term Northern lyre is sometimes used as a neutral name.

== Excavated lyres ==
=== Oberflacht (Germany) ===
The Oberflacht lyres gave evidence to a different kind of musician, the "Germanic warrior-musician". The graves marked them as warriors, and they were buried with their instruments in their arms.

The first Germanic lyre (Oberflacht 37) was found in 1846 in Oberflacht, not far from Konstanz on the Upper Rhine. It was found in a wooden burial chamber dated to the early 7th century. Less than half of the lyre survived, fragmented into four parts. It has a soundbox and arms hollowed out from oak, with a soundboard of maple. Initially the artefact was interpreted as the body and neck of a lute.

The second lyre was found in 1892 within the same cemetery in Oberflacht. This lyre (Oberflacht 84) was remarkably complete. Oak was used for the soundbox, whereas the soundboard was made from maple. The arms bent slightly outwards towards the top end, where the yoke was fastened to the arms with wooden pegs. It had no sound-holes. This lyre was moved to Berlin where it was preserved in a tank of alcohol. The lyre was destroyed during World War II when Russian soldiers drank the alcohol.

=== Köln (Germany) ===
The Köln (or Cologne) lyre was discovered during excavations in the Basilica of St. Severin, Cologne in 1939. It was found in a grave dated to the late 7th century/early 8th century. Only the left half of the lyre had survived. The soundbox was hollowed out from oak and covered with a maple board, which had been fastened with copper alloy nails. The yoke had six tuning pegs which decomposed when retrieved. There was evidence of a tail-piece of iron. This lyre was destroyed in bombing in June 1943.

=== Sutton Hoo (England) ===
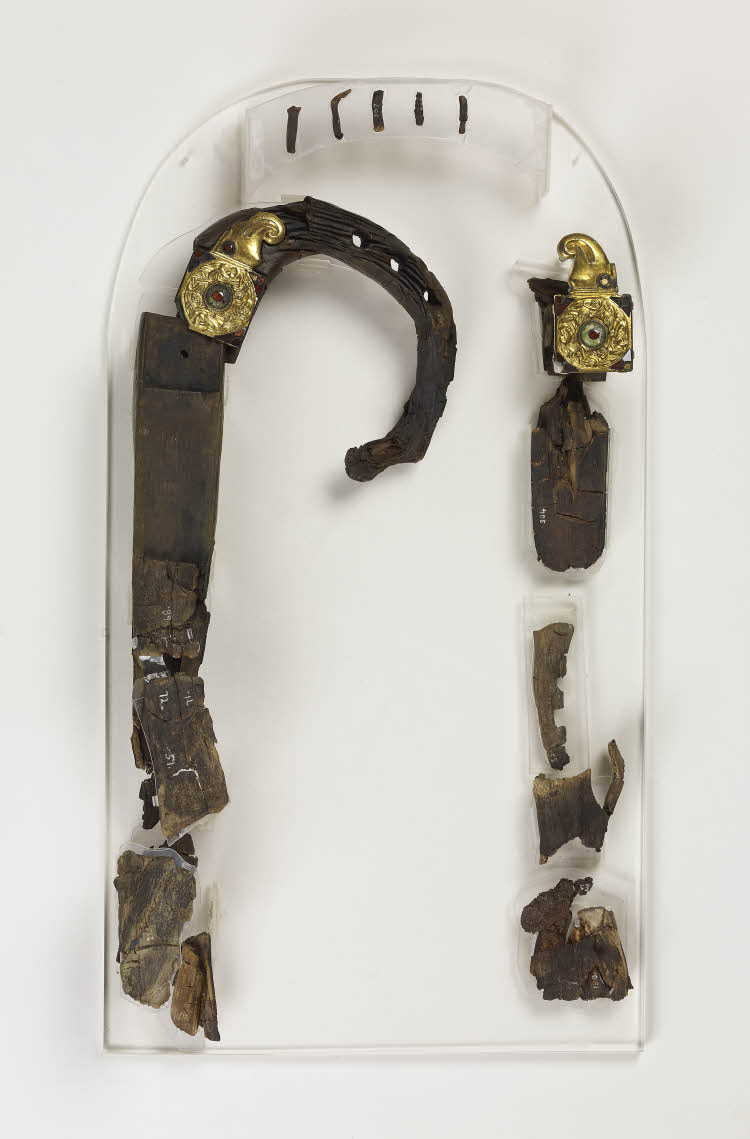
Sutton Hoo lyre, British Museum

Excavated in 1939, the Sutton Hoo ship burial dates from the early 7th century. The lyre had hung on the western wall of the chamber in a bag made out of beaver-skin. When it fell down, it hit a Coptic bowl and broke into pieces, and fragments from the upper part landed inside the bowl. What survives are the yoke, six tuning pegs, two metal escutcheons fashioned into interlace bird heads that joined the yoke to the hollowed-outside arms, and portions of the side arms.

The lyre was constructed from maple wood. The arms were hollowed out almost up to the joint and were then covered with a maple soundboard fastened with bronze pins. There were five willow pegs and a sixth of alder wood. The maple fragments of the lyre reveal beaver hair pressed onto it indicating a fur-lined carrying bag.

When the lyre was discovered at Sutton Hoo it was not identified as a lyre. Although three lyres had previously been unearthed in Germany, Rupert Bruce-Mitford mistakenly turned to another known stringed instrument, the harp, an instrument thought to exist in the early medieval era. In 1948 an awkward and unconvincing reconstruction of the lyre in the shape of a rectangular harp was revealed, based on (indistinct) harps depicted on some 9th century Irish stone crosses and harps in two English manuscripts from the 11th and 12th centuries. This harp was put on display in the British Museum in 1949. This interpretation lasted until 1970 when Rupert Bruce-Mitford and his daughter Myrtle, reassessed the instrument differently.

The new reconstruction of the Sutton Hoo lyre was aided by comparison with the other lyre remains. The first lyre from Oberflacht was preserved in a museum in Stuttgart; and a very fragmentary English lyre, unrecognized as such since its excavation in 1883 from a barrow in Taplow, Buckinghamshire, was finally recognised as a lyre. The remains of the two other German lyres had been destroyed in World War II but these also had been studied and published. With the reconstruction of the Sutton Hoo lyre came the realisation that the musical instrument referred to as a "hearpe" in Beowulf and similar writings, was in fact a lyre and not a harp. The accuracy of the Sutton Hoo lyre reconstruction was confirmed when further lyres were excavated from Trossingen in 2001 and Prittlewell in 2003.

=== Trossingen (Germany) ===
See Trossinger Leier (in German)

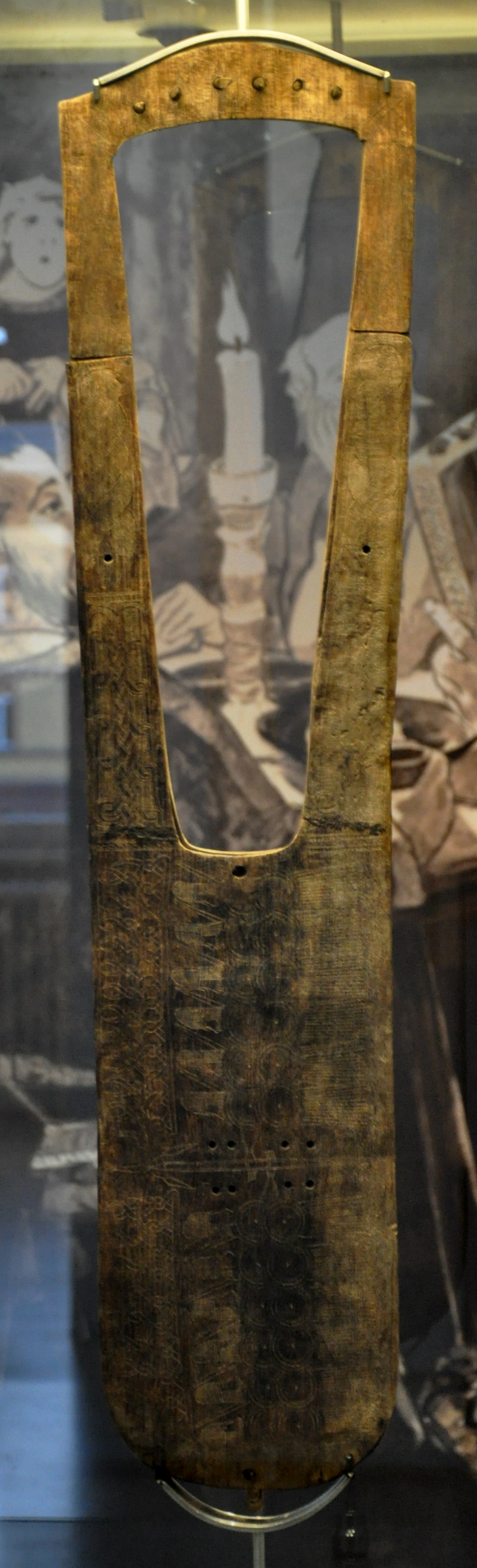
Trossingen lyre

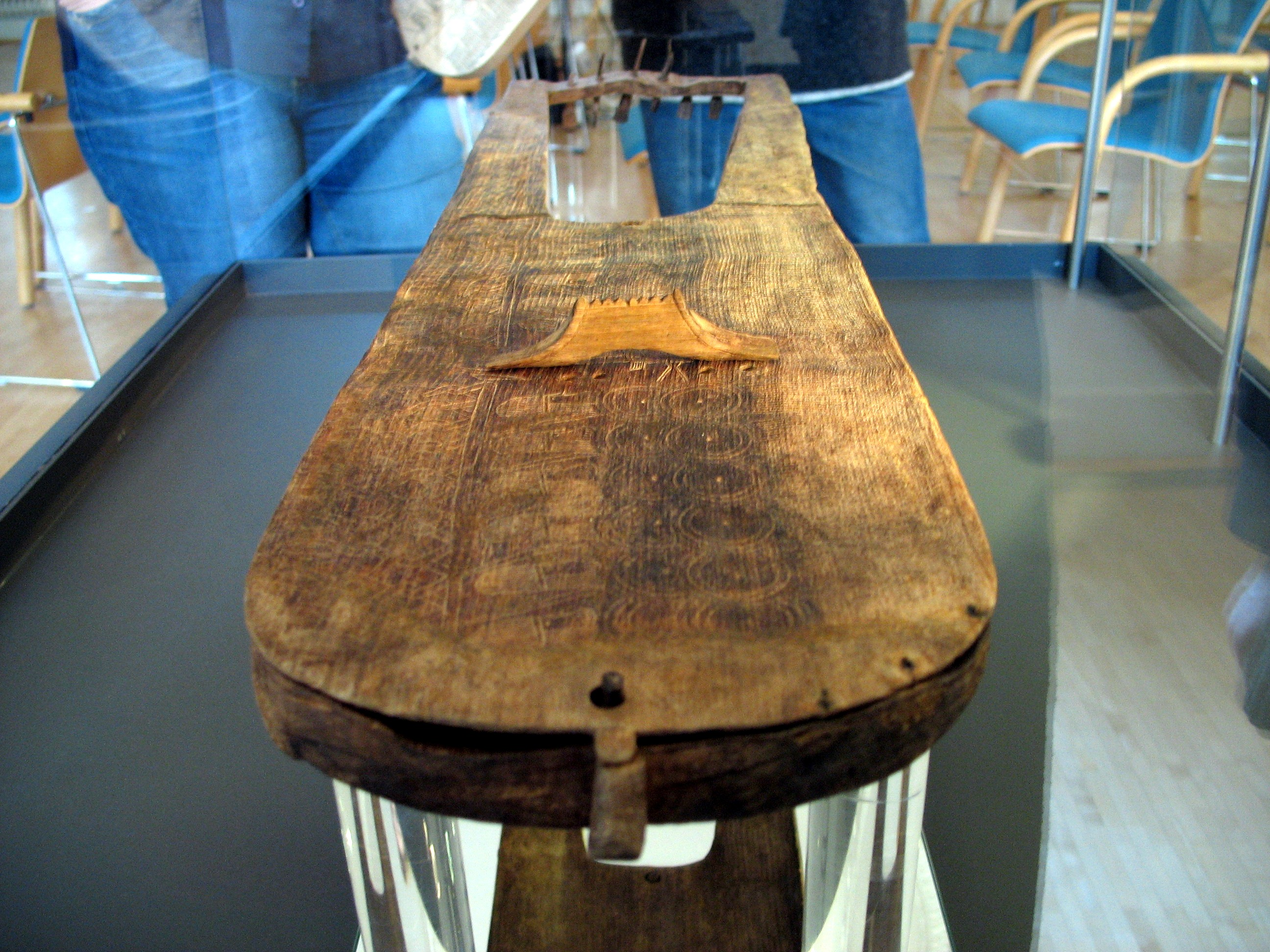
Trossingen lyre, showing the willow-wood bridge that was found with the instrument. Even though its bridge was built for seven strings, the lyre itself only had pegs for six strings. The bridge sat on the soundboard between the soundholes. Dimensions: 31 5/8 × 7 11/16 cm × 5/16 inches.

The Trossingen lyre was discovered in the winter of 2001/2002 during excavations of a cemetery at Trossingen, in Baden-Württemberg, not far from Oberflacht. The lyre was found in a narrow burial chamber, with weapons and items of wooden furniture. Discovered in water-logged conditions, the lyre is exceptionally well-preserved.

Dating to circa 560 A.D. (the Merovingian period), it was excavated from a medieval cemetery in Germany. The lyre was made of maple with a thin maple soundboard nailed and glued to the body with bone glue. It had soundholes on the soundboard and on the yoke arms. There is a bridge made from willow and six tuning pegs, four of which are ash and two are hazel. Its six strings were probably horsehair or gut.

The lyre has an exceptional set of decorations. On one side there are two groups of warriors, while the remaining space is decorated with an animal style pattern.

=== Prittlewell (England) ===
The Prittlewell royal Anglo-Saxon burial was discovered in 2003, and was one of the richest Anglo-Saxon graves ever found. The wooden lyre had almost entirely decayed except for a dark soil stain revealing its outline. Fragments of wood and metal fittings of iron, silver and gilded copper-alloy were preserved in their original positions, and the "complete form" of the instrument could be captured with modern imaging technology. The entire block of soil was lifted and moved to a conservation lab where it was examined with X-rays, CT scans, and a laser scan. Micro-excavation revealed that the instrument was made of maple with tuning pegs made of ash. The lyre had been broken in two at some time during its life and put back together using iron, gilded copper-alloy and silver repair fittings.

== Lyre finds to date ==
At least 30 lyre finds of this type have been discovered in archaeological excavations, including one in Denmark, eleven in England, eight in Germany, two in the Netherlands, three in Norway and four in Sweden. The majority of lyre finds are either bridges or parts of the upper yoke and surrounding fittings. One find, from Sigtuna, Sweden, consists of a tuning key for adjusting tuning pegs.

Date	Name	Country	Comments	
550-450 B.C.	Uamh an Ard Achadh (High Pasture Cave)	Isle of Skye (Scotland)	Section of a possible bridge, made from oak. If from a lyre, the find shows the instrument's early use in Scotland. Scanned with laser to show dimensions.	Illustration showing a bridge for a stringed instrument, from High Pasture Cave, Isle of Skye
5th century	Abingdon-on-Thames	England	Found in a Saxon cemetery from 425 to 625 A.D. Curved bone yoke fragment with five holes. Bone "facings" (18.3 and 18.5 cm long), one on the front and one on the back of the yoke.	Facing for lyre yoke. Yellow holes are original (where pins passed through).
560 AD	Trossingen	Germany	Near-complete lyre with elaborate carvings. Found in a grave of a member of the Alemanni people.	Bridge found with Trossingen lyre, circa 560 A.D. 8.8 cm × 1 cm × 2.2 cm.
590 AD	Prittlewell	England	Decayed wooden remains with metal fittings and wood fragments. Garnets in the metal fittings were likely from Sri Lankha or the Indian sub-continent. Modern imaging in 2003 of the untouched soil in which the instrument had decayed confirmed "the complete form of an Anglo-Saxon lyre." The lyre's form in the earlier discovery of the Sutton Hoo lyre had not been apparent initially.	
6th century	Oberflacht (84)	Germany	Found in a hillside called "Lupfen", "Lupfen bei Oberflacht" or "Lupfenberg", now referred to as Oberflacht after the Oberflacht parish. Near-complete lyre lost in World War II. 81 cm long, oak body, maple soundboard. Arms bent outward slightly where yoke was attached. The Oberflacht lyres probably did not have a tailpiece, and strings were directly attached directly to the "peg end" on the bottom of the instruments. Other possibilities include an intermediary "loop of gut cord or wire hitched around the end-button" and a tailpiece made by inserting a rigid bar into the loop. However the Cologne lyre had an iron tailpiece, and tailpieces were illustrated in 9th century manuscripts. Tailpiece also illustrated in 8th century manuscript from Carolingian Empire.	Oberflacht 84 outline based on replica destroyed during WWII Artist impression in 1915 of Oberflacht (84) lyre. Modern researchers put less curve in the sides.
Late 6th / early 7th century	Schlotheim	Germany	Antler bridge, 5.9 cm long, designed to hold five strings. Asymmetrical, "oblong and unshaped".	
6–7th century	Bergh Apton	England	Metal fittings and wooden arm fragments. Halfway along each arm on the outside were "bronze-dome headed pins", push pins to hold a braided strap in place. Experiment shows that a strap "looped behind and once around the player's left wrist" gave firmness and balance to the instrument when seated. Did not work to carry instrument, as pins set too high on neck and the instrument hung too low.	
6–7th century	Eriswell 221	England	Decayed wooden remains with copper-alloy fittings	
6–7th century	Eriswell 255	England	Scatter of wood and metal fragments in the shape of a lyre	
6–7th century	Eriswell 313	England	Jointed top of a lyre	
7th century	Oberflacht (37)	Germany	Large fragments of the left side of a lyre	
Early Anglo-Saxon	Morning Thorpe	England	Two wooden fragments with metal pins and plates	
610–635 AD	Sutton Hoo	England	Upper parts of the arms with two bronze bird plaques; a yoke with six holes; and five pegs	
620–640 AD	Taplow	England	Metal bird ornaments and wooden fragments of the yoke and joints	Picture at British Museum website
Anglo-Saxon	Snape	England	Wooden fragments from the arms and upper joints; copper alloy strip and pins. A possible wrist strap of "textile" with metal fittings was near the instrument.	
Late 7th / early 8th century	Cologne	Germany	Roughly one-half of a lyre discovered in-tact in a tomb under St. Severin's church. Destroyed in World War II but copy was made. Original had a metal tailpiece. Tailpiece on copied instrument is metal, wraps under instrument and is secured on the back. Body, 53 inches long carved from oak, maple soundboard nailed to body with copper nails. Six tuning pegs.	Outline of copy of the rotta found in Cologne under St Severin's church.
720 A.D.	Ribe	Denmark	Wooden yoke with six holes and four tuning pins. Urban Viking culture, found in coastal town.	
8th century	Dorestad (140)	Netherlands	Amber bridge found at Dorestad, six notches for strings, 5 cm x 2.5 cm	Dorestadt 140 bridge for Germanic lyre
8th century	Dorestad (141)	Netherlands	Amber bridge found at Dorestad, seven notches for strings, 3.7 cm x 2.5 cm	Dorestad 141 bridge for Germanic lyre
8th century	Elisenhof I	Germany	Amber bridge fragment	
8th century	Elisenhof II	Germany	Amber bridge	
Viking age	Birka	Sweden	Horn lyre bridge for a string instrument, notches for 7 strings. One side is shiny and smooth, the other is porous. Bridge for a musical instrument.	Circa 800-1100 A.D. Lyre bridge of horn, Statens Historiska Museer.
Frankish	Concevreux	France	Bronze bridge with animal head decoration	Illustration of a bronze bridge for lyre. The bridge was found at a grave in Concevreux; the culture was Franks.
9th century	Broa	Sweden	Amber bridge	Circa 800-1100 A.D. Bridge for lyre made of amber, found in Broa, Halla, Gotland, Sweden.
10th century	Coppergate dig site, York	England	Wooden bridge. (front view): "quadrangular" with hole in center, 2.7 cm high, six grooves on top for strings. (side view): triangular, point at top, wide end resting on soundboard. Viking settlement, urban setting.	Front view of a lyre bridge found in York, England at the Coppergate dig site.
10–11th century	Hedeby	Germany	Arched wooden yoke with six holes	
11th century	Gerete	Sweden	Bronze bridge	800-1100 A.D. Gerete, Fardhem parish, Gotland, Sweden. Bronze bridge for lyre, eight strings. Exhibited as Viking Age artifact.
1100 AD	Sigtuna	Sweden	Tuning key made from elk horn, and carved with runes	Tuning key with runes.
Early 13th century	Trondheim	Norway	Wooden bridge, possibly unfinished, with runes reading "ruhta". No notches for strings visible.	
Early 13th century	Oslo I	Oslo, Norway	Curved wooden bridge made of pine with five notches, 74 mm long, 29 mm high and 14 mm thick. Found in 1988. For bowed lyre or possibly non-lyre fiddle (such as vielle or rebec). "...Clearly curved along the top."	Bridge for stringed musical instrument (bowed lyre or other fiddle) found in Oslo in 1988.
Mid-13th century	Oslo II	Oslo, Norway	Found in 1971. Flat wooden bridge made of pine, notched for seven strings, 10.1 cm x 3.3 cm.	
15th-16th century	Kravic lyre	Numedal, Norway	The Germanic lyre survived in Norway as late as the 16th century. One was found at the Kravic farm in Numedal, Norway, made of pine with seven strings.	Kravic lyre

== Construction ==
Of the lyres analysed, all the bodies are made of maple, oak, or a combination of the two. The material for the bridges on the lyres varies greatly, including bronze, amber, antler, horn, willow and pine. The preferred wood for the pegs being ash, hazel or willow. The lyres range from 53 cm (Köln) to 81 cm in length (Oberflacht 84). Half the lyres found have six strings, a quarter have seven strings, and the remainder five or eight strings, with only two having the latter.

== Playing the lyre ==
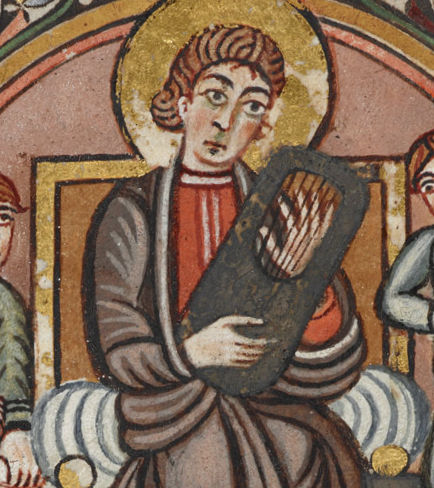
8th century A.D., Vespasian Psalter, England. An Anglo-Saxon round lyre being played using the block and strum technique.

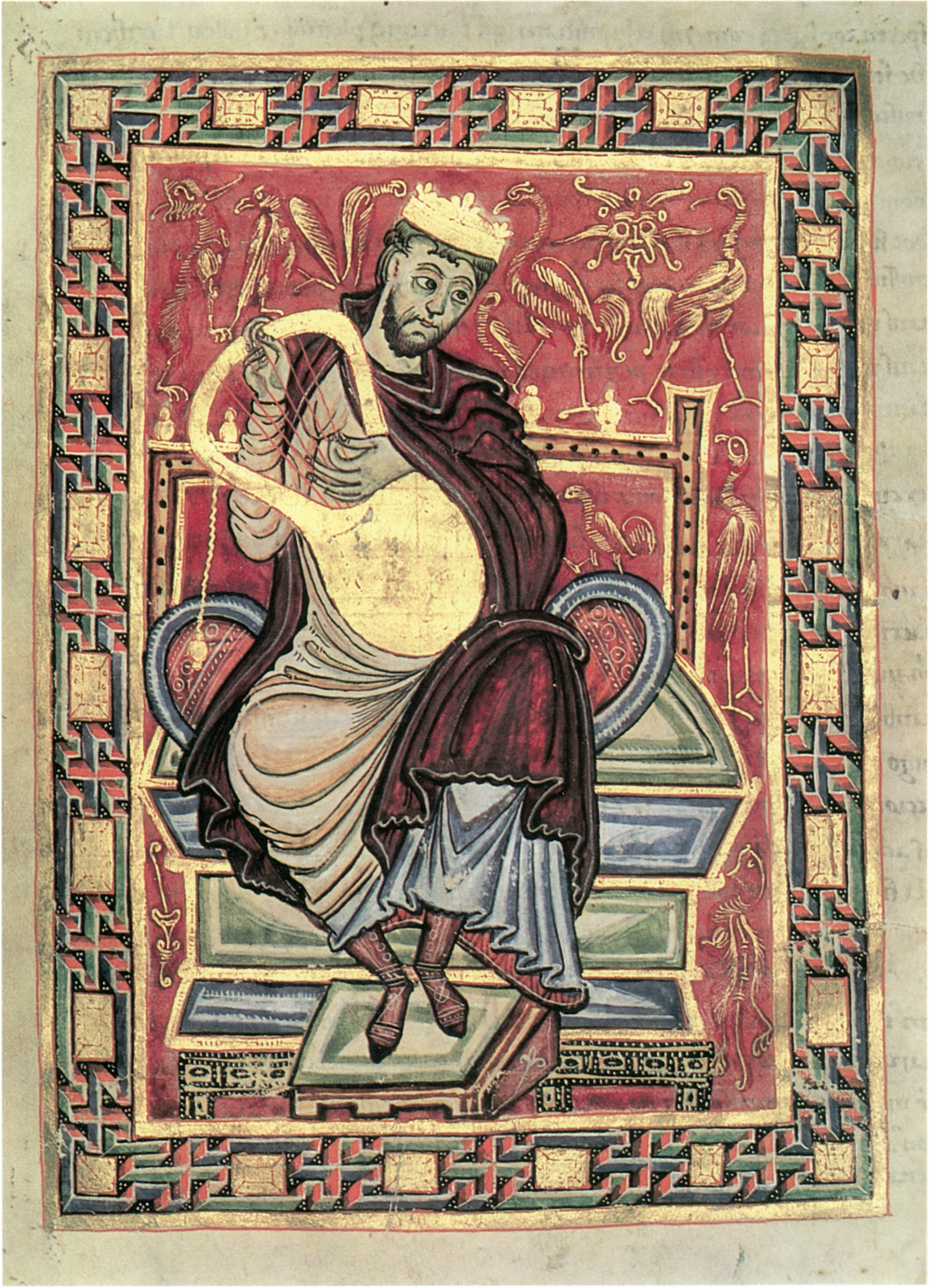
10th century A.D., Germany. David playing a round, waisted Germanic lyre.).

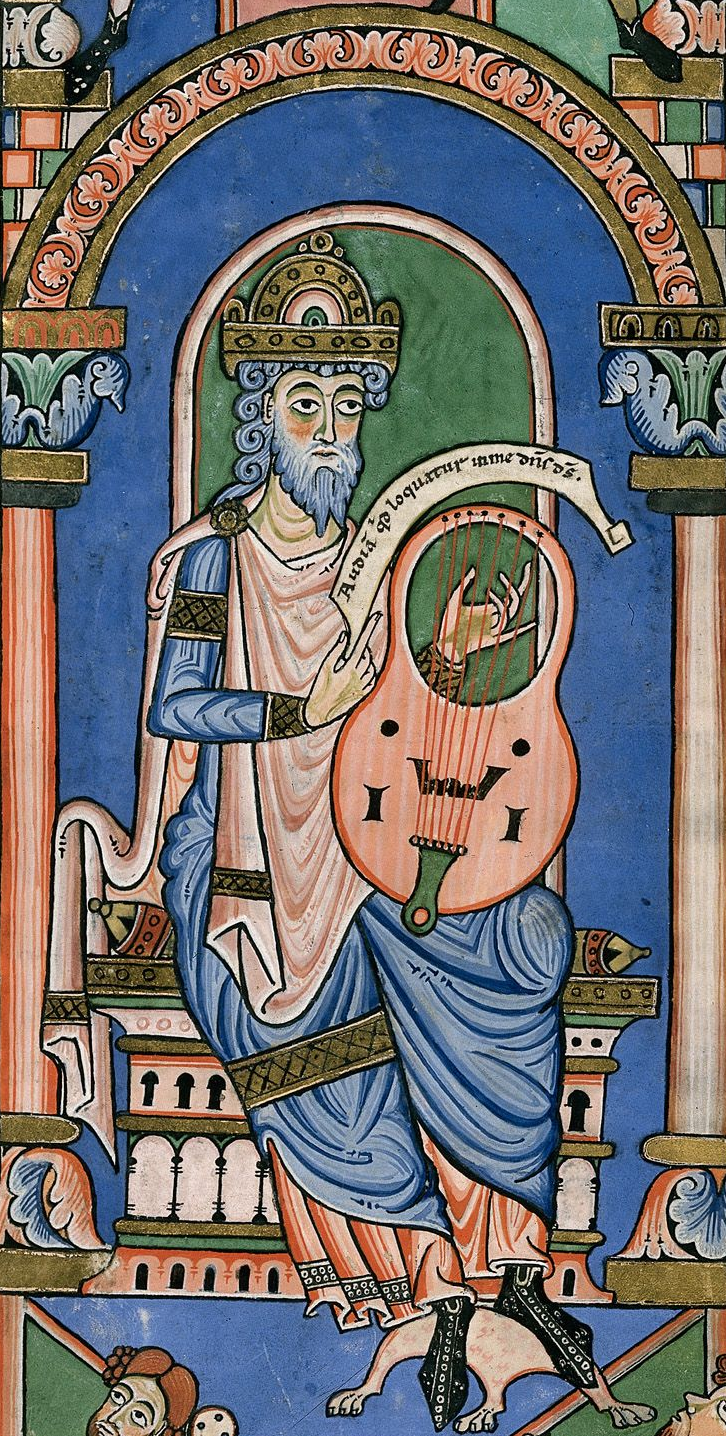
11th century A.D., Germany. David playing a round, waisted Germanic lyre, has a tailpiece.

Much research has been done by scholars into how the lyre was played. This takes two forms: historians of early music who used their knowledge of historic music and instruments to work out how to play it and historians who read old texts to find mentions of it.

The Vespasian Psalter and Durham Cassiodorus have images of the lyre being held, showing it placed upon one knee with one hand held behind it to block or pluck strings. The Bergh Apton lyre had enough remains of push-pins and a wrist strap for Graeme Lawson to experiment in 1980; he found that a strap that attached midway on the arms of an instrument, that looped around and behind the left wrist gave good support. He was able, then to use both hands on the strings, with the instrument on his lap. Five of the lyre finds show evidence of a wrist strap. These finds consist of either leather loops or plugs on the side of the lyre to fit a strap on. Wear marks have also been found on the arms of the Trossingen lyre, indicating when the left hand was not being used to play, it was gripping the arms of the lyre.

=== Tuning ===
How the lyre was tuned is unknown. The only contemporary account of lyres comes from the Frankish monk and music theorist Hucbald in his book De Harmonica Institutione, written around 880 AD. In it he describes how he believes the Roman philosopher, Boethius (480–524 AD), would have tuned his six-string lyre. Whether how the Romans tuned their lyres is transferable to Anglo-Saxon lyre is debated among aficionados. Hucbald's conclusion was that Boethius used the first six notes of the major scale.

=== Block and strum technique ===
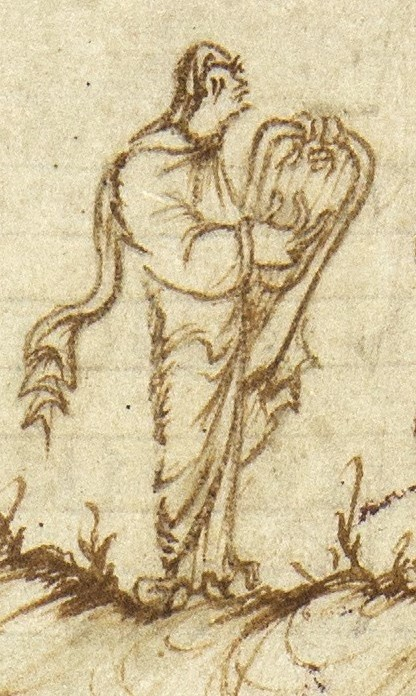
Circa 850 A.D. Angle-Saxon hearpe in the Utrecht Psalter. The musician appears to be plucking two strings at once.

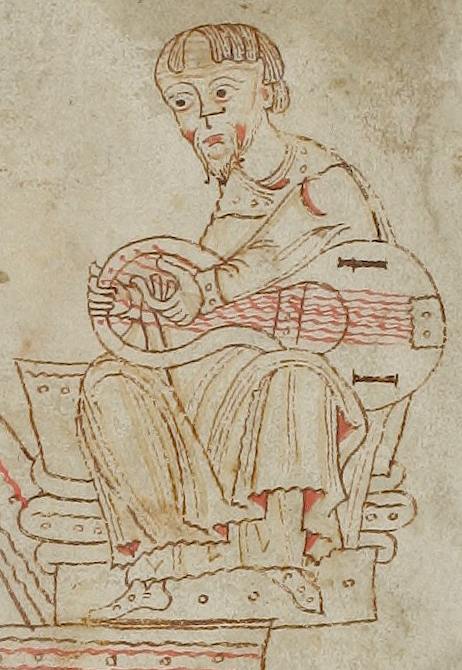
12th century A.D., Switzerland. Germanic lyre or rotte, played horizontally, the fingerwork done with one hand.

The block and strum technique seems to have been a widely used and very common technique for lyre playing, images of it being used can be found on Ancient Egyptian wall art, on Ancient Greek Urns and specifically for the Anglo-Saxon Lyre on the Vespasian Psalter. To use the technique the lyre is strummed while the other hand mutes several strings, so only strings which combine to make chords are heard. The number of chords a lyre can make is limited compared to a fretted instrument and is also dependent on the number of strings it has. An alternative strum and block technique to chord playing is to tune one or more strings as drone strings and use the remaining strings to play melody, similar to a hurdy-gurdy.

=== Plucking ===
The Utrecht Psalter contains an image of the Anglo-Saxon lyre being plucked, the musician is shown plucking two strings simultaneously creating a chord. Plectrums were also used to play the lyre, the Anglo-Saxons having several words for plectrum, the main one being hearpenaegel. Several copper objects have been found the exact size and shape of modern-day plastic plectrums and may have been plectrums, however no proven plectrums survive so their make up can only be surmised. Other possibilities include quills made from bird feathers which were known to have been used to play medieval lutes, medieval Ouds used plectrums made animal horn and wood.

== Origin and relationship to lyres elsewhere ==
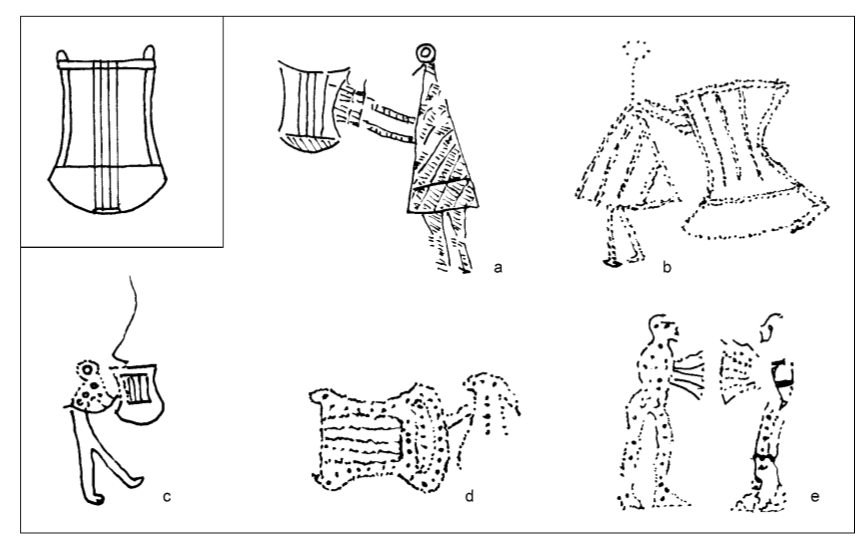
8th century B.C. or earlier. Translation of extant depictions of musicians playing lyre-like stringed instruments from Stringed Instruments of the Hallstatt Culture - From Iconographic Depiction to Experimental Reproduction by Beate Maria Pomberger

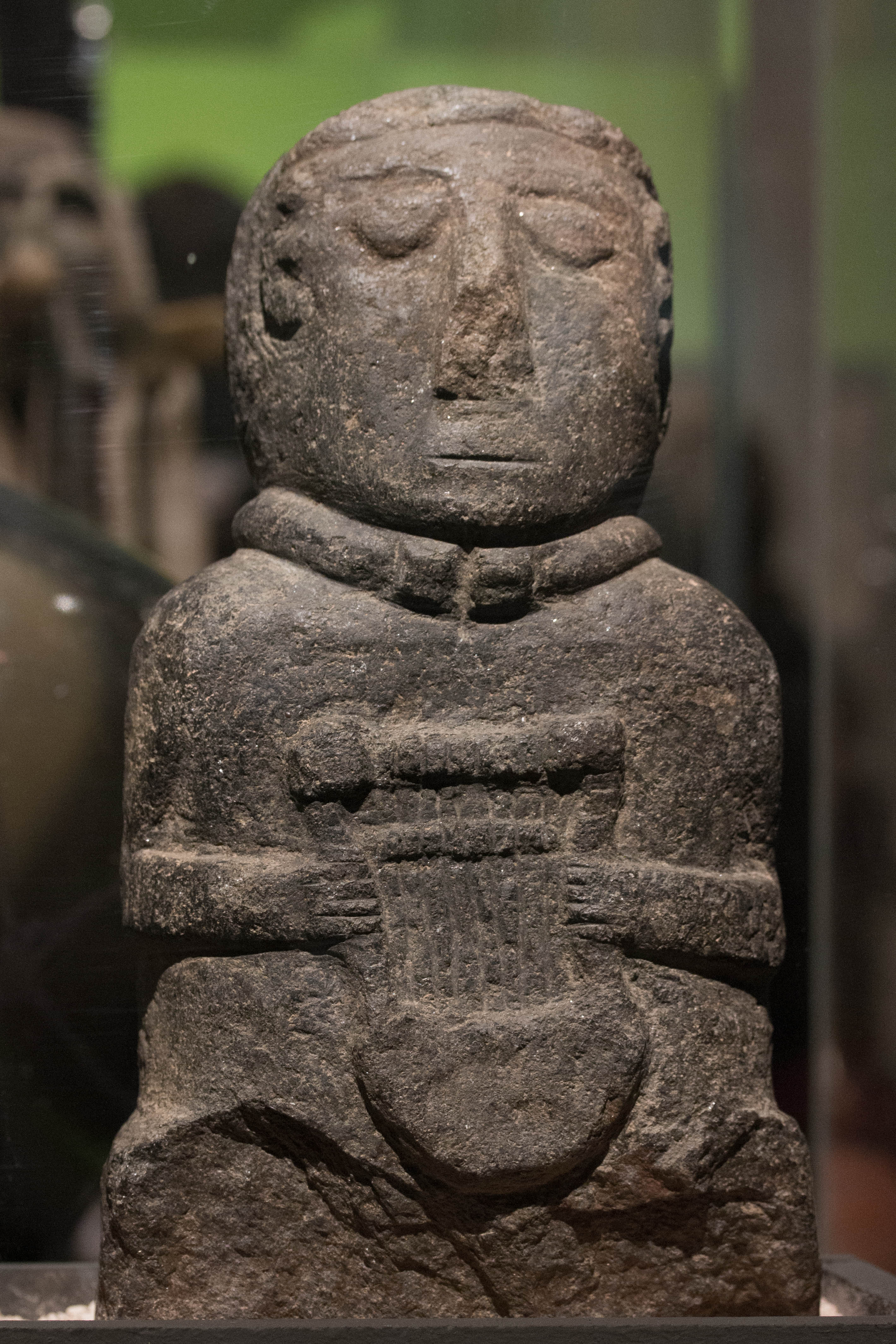
2nd or 1st century BC buste-socle found in Paule, in Brittany, an area inhabited by the Veneti.

The relationship between northern European lyres of the first millennium and earlier lyres of the classical Mediterranean is not at all clear. A distinction between Mediterranean and northern strands of lyre culture dates from much earlier than the Middle Ages.

=== Central and northern Europe ===
In central Europe, lyres are depicted on artefacts of the proto-Celtic Hallstatt culture from around 700 BC, although their forms differ greatly from Germanic lyres.

In the west (modern Brittany), a Gaulish lyre similar to the Hallstat lyres is shown on a stone buste-socle from the 2nd or 1st century BC which was discovered in 1988. It depicts a figure wearing a torc playing a seven-string lyre, likely constructed from wood, but with a wider, rounder body like the turtle-shell lyres of ancient Mediterranean cultures.

An excavation in 2010 in High Pasture Cave on the Isle of Skye, Scotland, revealed a piece of wood dating from the 4th century BC, which is interpreted by some non-experts to be a bridge of a lyre. The bridge being burnt and broken makes it hard to estimate how many notches it would have originally had, with only two or three remaining. This has prompted some to suggest it was an early bowed lyre similar to a Shetland Gue, however this is also unlikely as the use of a bow on stringed instruments doesn't appear in the British Isles until approximately the 11th Century AD.

The six-string Germanic lyre tradition appears in the archaeological record by the 2nd century AD, in a settlement at Habenhausen near Bremen, Germany. A wooden object excavated in the 1980s from a marsh settlement in Habenhausen, turned out to be the yoke of a lyre. The six holes show that the original musical instrument, barely 20 cm wide, had six strings.

=== Central Asia ===
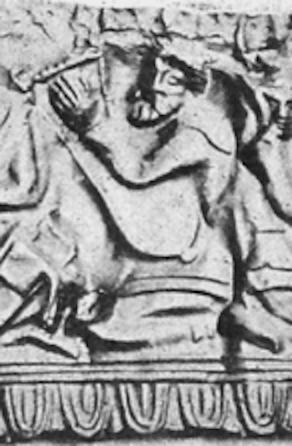
Scythian lyre, 4th century B.C. Detail from the Sakhnivka-gold-plate.

In the 4th century BC a lyre was depicted on a broad gold Scythian headband known as the Sakhnivka Plate. This artwork, from a kurgan of Sakhnivka in modern Ukraine, shows a long, extended lyre similar to the shape of later Germanic lyres.

Another find of the same type is a wooden instrument excavated in 1973 from a medieval settlement belonging to the Dzhetyasar culture in southwest Kazakhstan. Dating to the 4th century AD, recent re-examination of the artifact has emphasized its close similarity to Germanic lyres. "One bears a strikingly close resemblance to lyre finds from Western Europe, including the instrument from Mound 1 at Sutton Hoo: the Sutton Hoo lyre....if it had been discovered in an Anglo-Saxon cemetery, or indeed anywhere else in the West, the Dzhetyasar lyre would not have seemed out of place.

Another similar instrument is the traditional nares-jux, or Siberian lyre, played among the Siberian Khanty and Mansi peoples.

== Round lyres, bowed tradition ==
Different from the Irish crwth (with its fingerboard), the Germanic round lyre also developed bowed versions. Among the earliest images include an ivory relief on the 11th century A.D. Lothair Psalter.

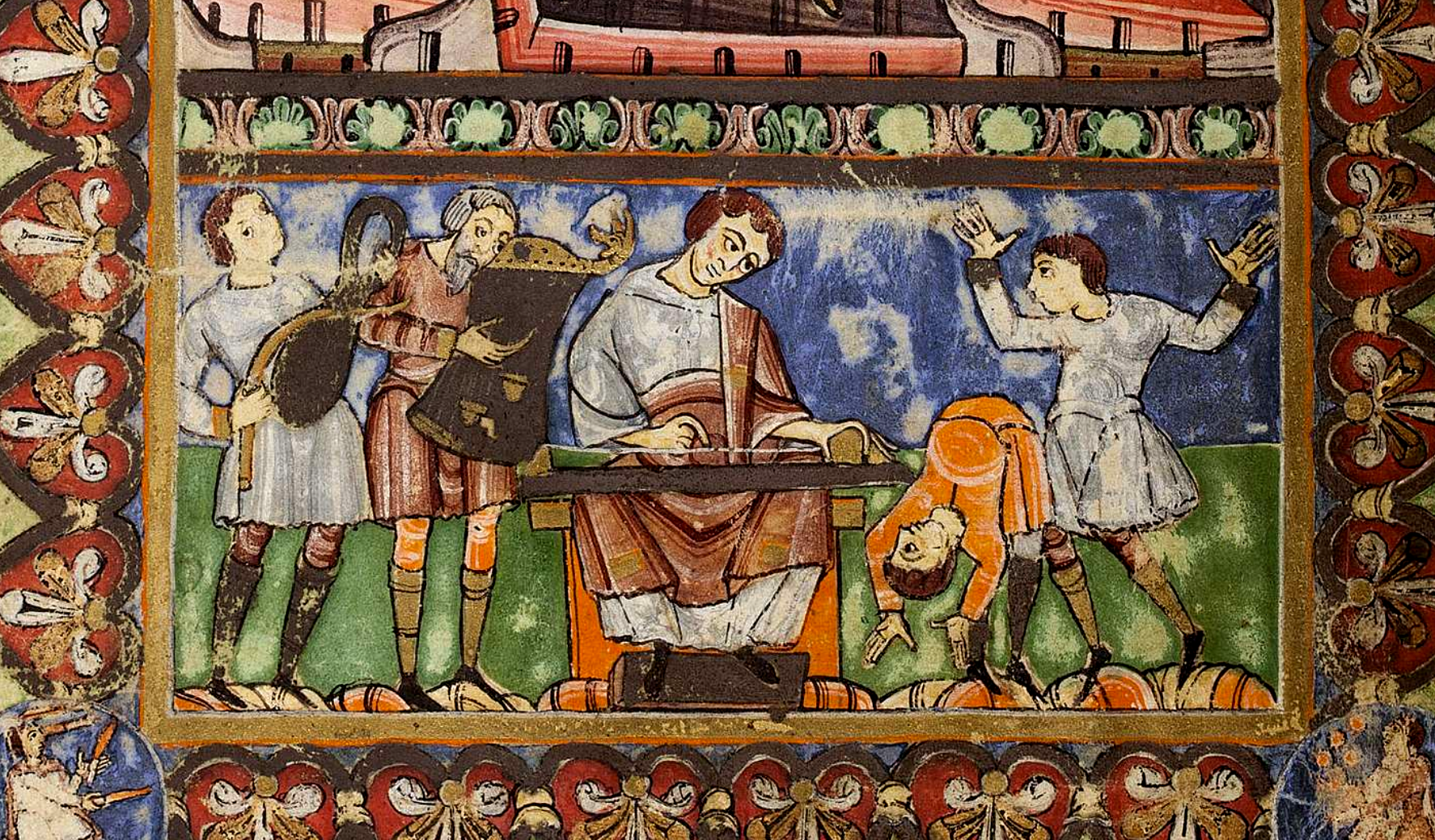
1029-1050 A.D., Germany. Werner Psalter. Bowed Germanic lure (far left)

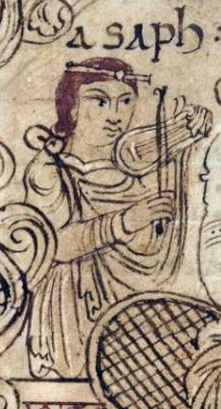
1025-1050, England. Asaph playing bowed lyre, detail from Winchcombe Psalter, Cambridge University Library, Ff.1.23, folio 4v

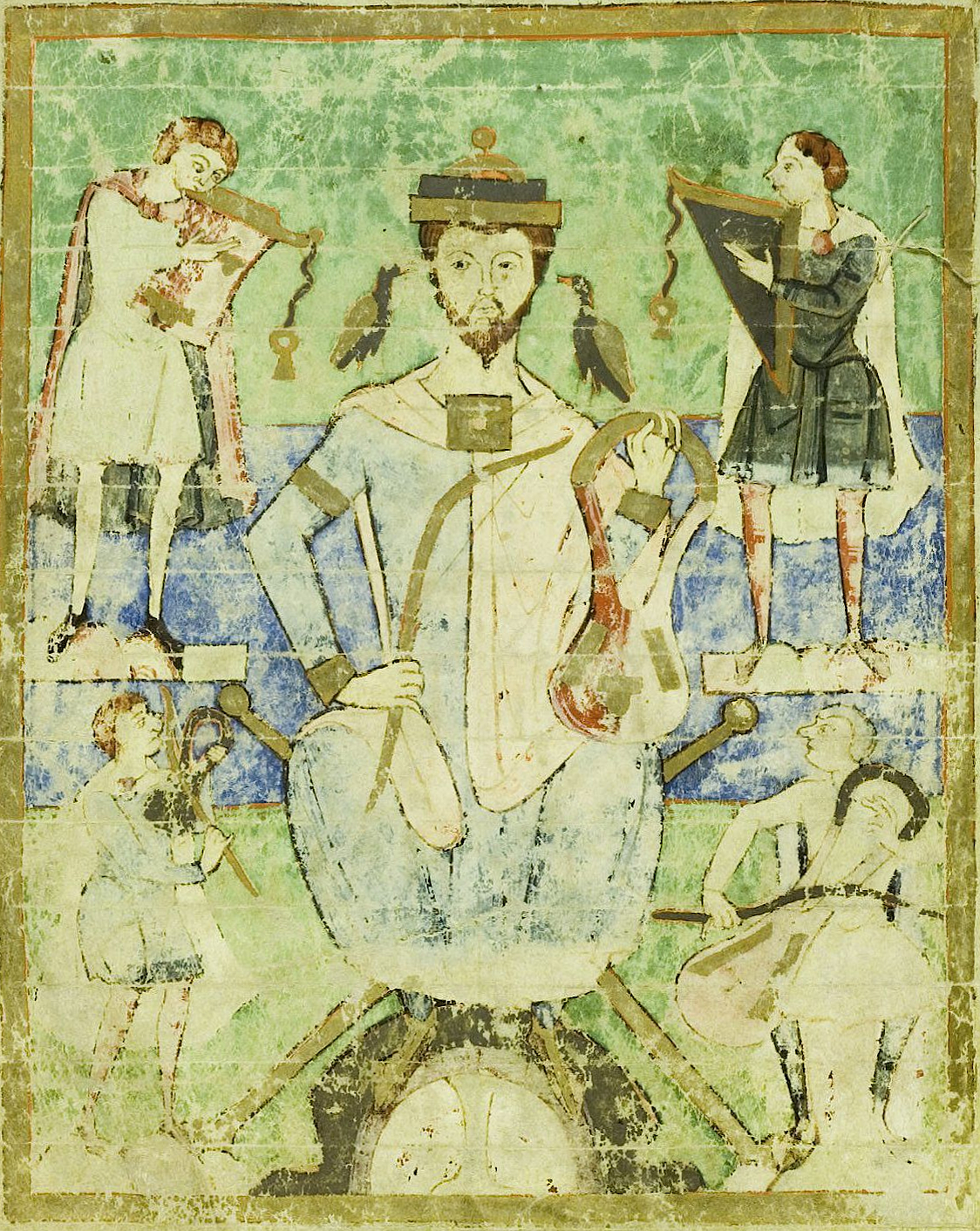
End of 11th century A.D., Klosterneuburg Abbey, Austria. David with bowed rotte, from Klosterneuburg, Augustinian Canonry, Cod. 987 'PRAYER BOOK OF LEOPOLD THE SAINT'.

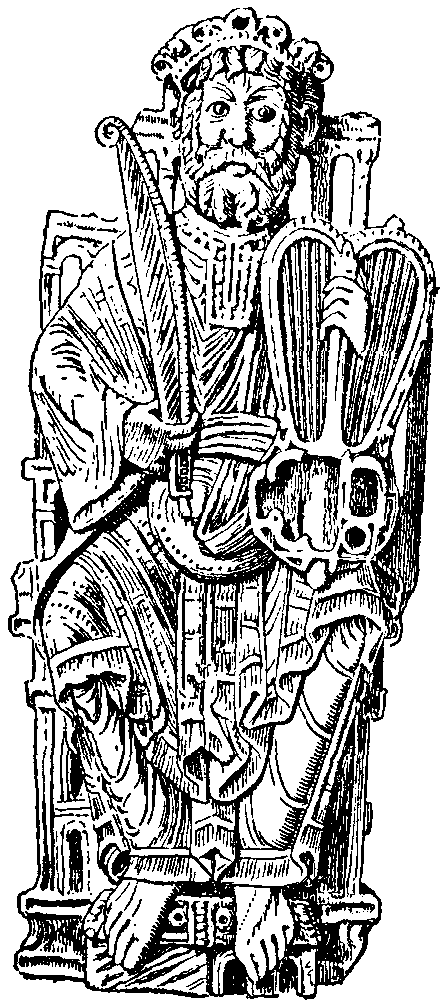
12th century A.D. Kingdom of Germany or Holy Roman Empire. Bowed round lyre on the Lothair Psalter. Engraving lacks fine details in the original, such as the mechanism to adjust the tension of the bow.

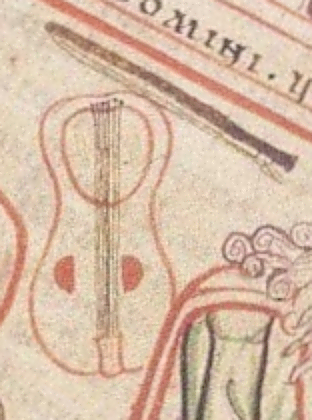
Early 13th century A.D., Aldersbach, Germany. Bowed lyre without fingerboard from, Bayerische Staatsbibliothek Munchen, BSB, CLM 2599, folio 96v.

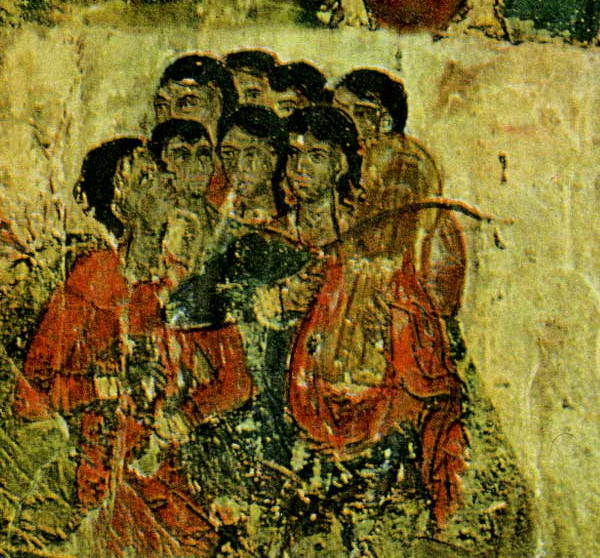
13th century, Russia. Bowed lyre, from Simonovskaya Psalter, State Historical Museum, Moscow

== Transition to lute, a theory ==
See Cythara for theories on lute/guitar development in medieval Europe

In the early 20th century, Kathleen Schlessinger published a theory in the 1911 Encyclopædia Britannica which suggests that the modern acoustic guitar could have arisen from the rotte, in changes observed in iconography.

Under Schlessinger's theory, the crossbar on a bass rotte lyre would disappear and its arms shrink, replaced by an arm in the middle (the lute or guitar's neck). When the neck was added to the rotta's body, the instrument ceased to be a rotta and became a guitar, or a guitar fiddle if played with a bow.

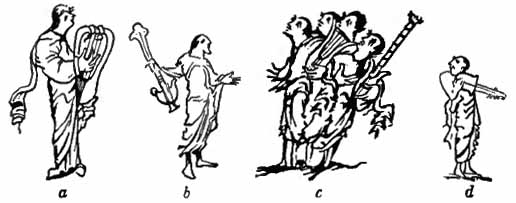
Figure 3 from the 1911 Encyclopædia Britannica article "guitar fiddle." The picture illustrated a theory showing the transformation of the lute from a lyre. (A) base rotta (C) the first transformation (B) the cithara as lute (D) the cithara as lute.

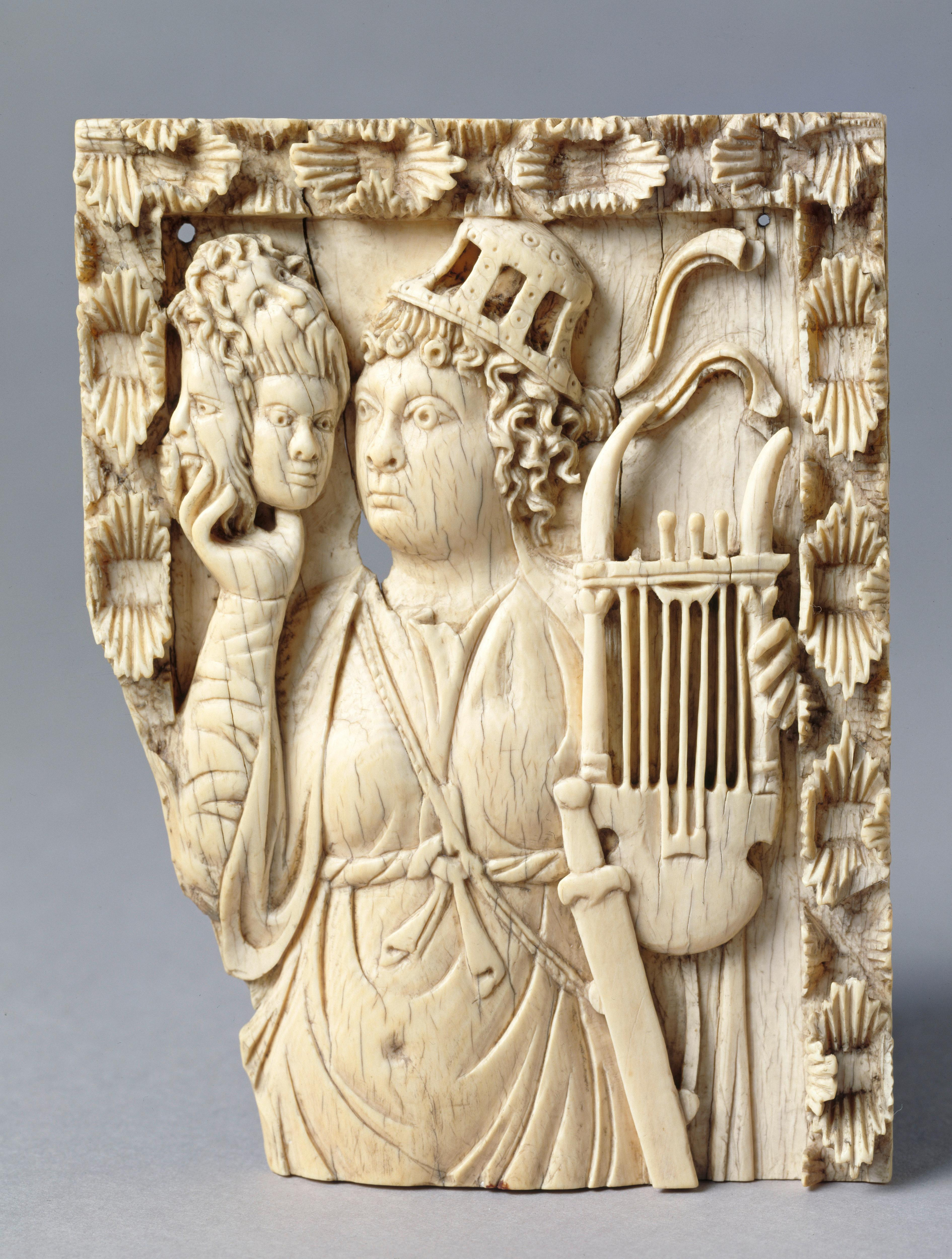
Early 6th century A.D., Trier. Roman culture, a mime with mask and a lyre. Germans took over Trier in the mid-5th century A.D. Shape of lyre resembles that in the Charles the Bald Bible.

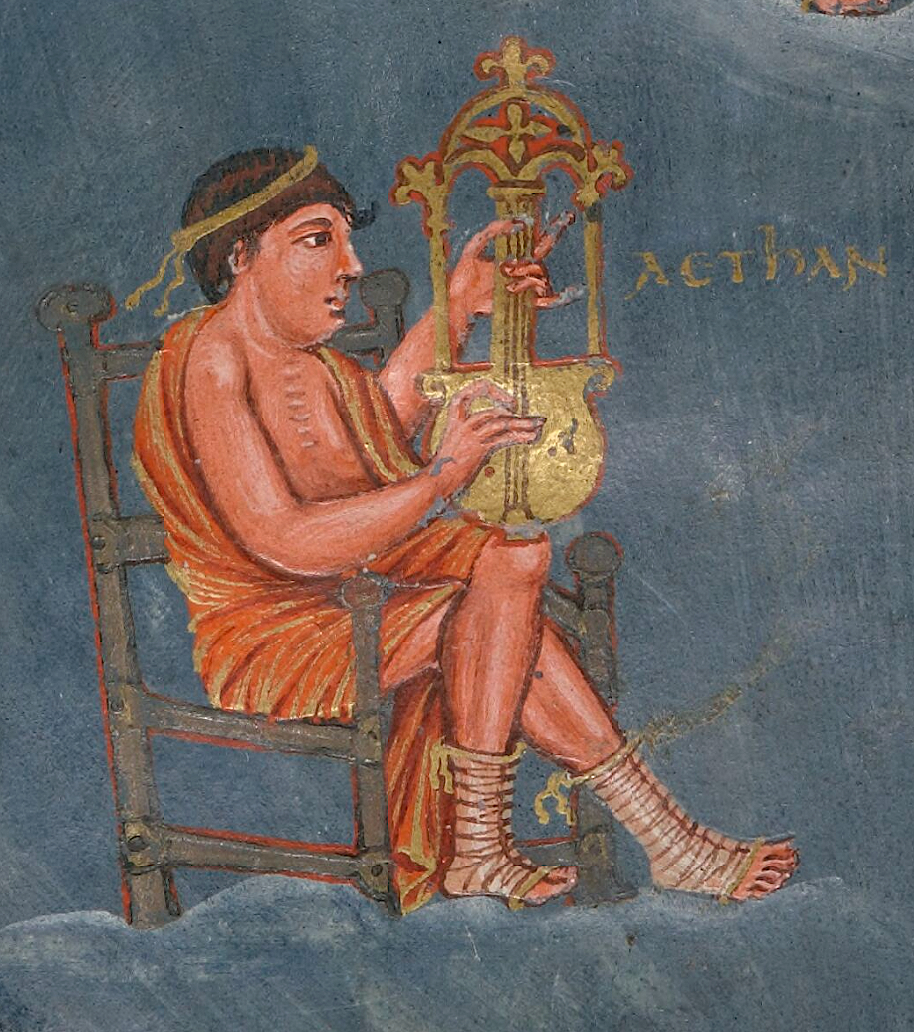
Charles the Bald Bible miniature, showing an instrument midway between lyre and lute

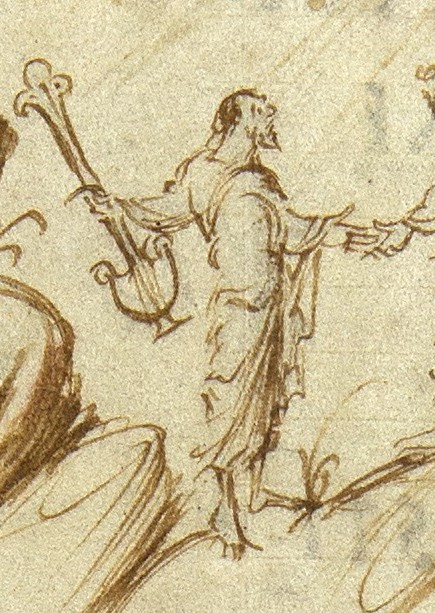
Illustration used in Britannica theory. Arms are gone and the central neck enlarged.

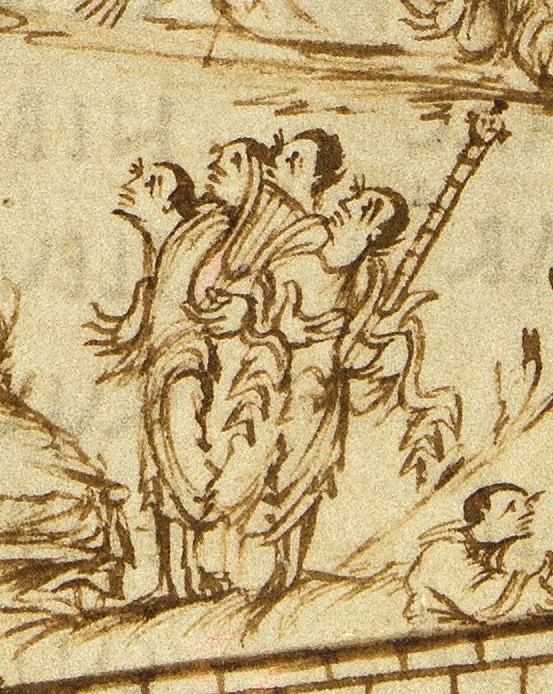
Illustration used in Britannica theory

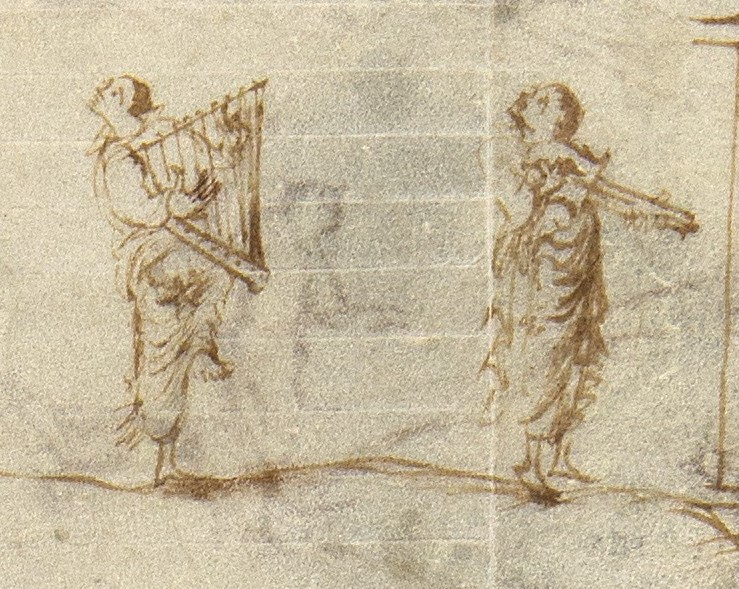
Illustration used in Britannica theory

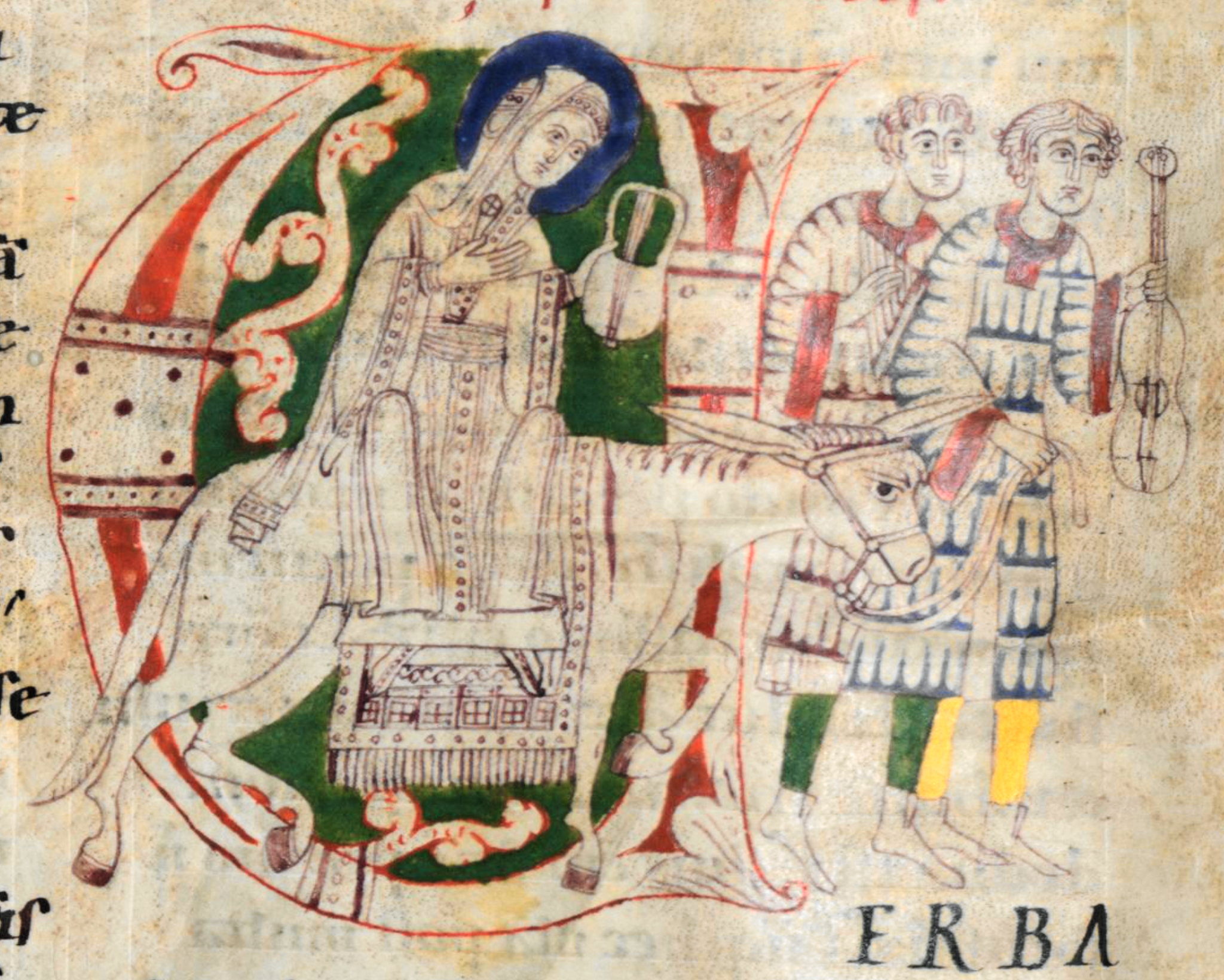
Circa 1125-1150 A.D., Germany. Schlessinger wrote, "Both instruments have three strings and the characteristic guitar outline with incurvations, the rotta differing in having no neck."

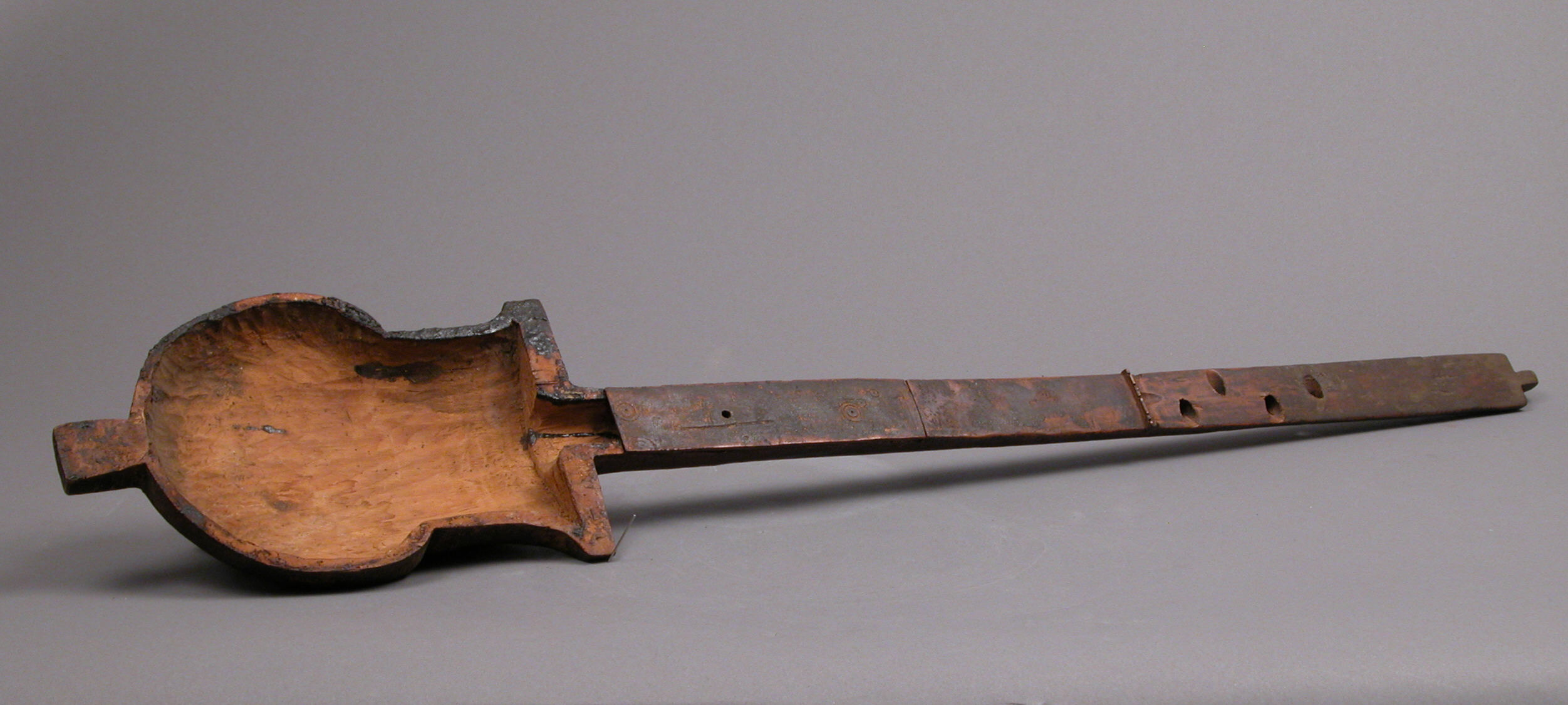
A similarity between the Germanic lutes and the coptic lute (which the cithara resembles) is a hollowed arm or neck in each instrument, covered by a soundboard.

== See also ==
- Kithara, a 7 string Greek lyre with a wooden soundbox
- Krar, a 5 or 6 string lyre from Ethiopia and Eritrea
