= Origin of the harp in Europe =

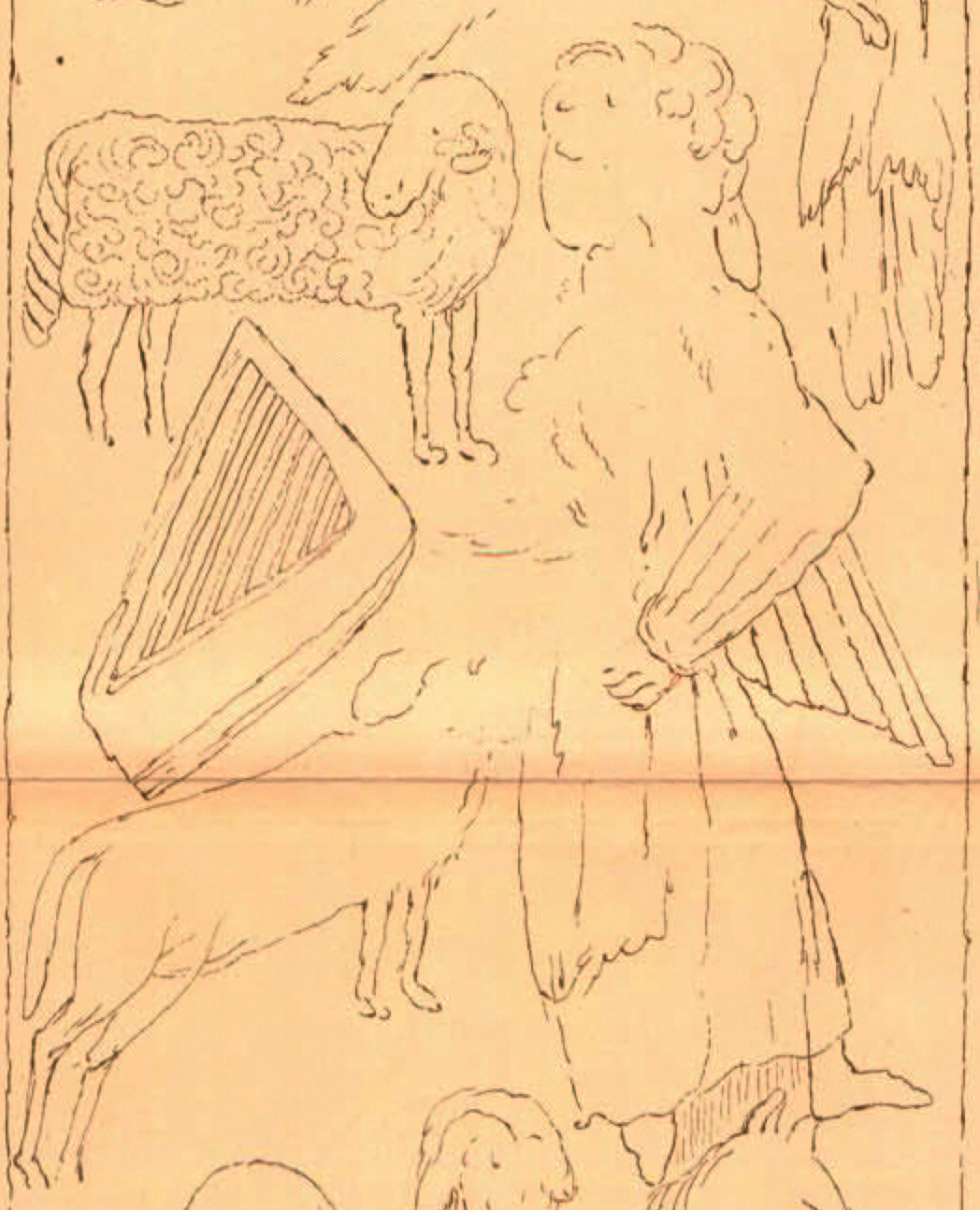
The Nigg Stone 790–799 AD carving of a Pictish harp, selected portion of a 19th-century illustration

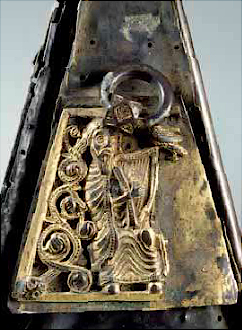
The earliest depiction of an Irish harp, c.1000—1100 AD. Depicted on the side of the reliquary shrine of St. Máedóc or Mogue of Ferns, County Wexford, Ireland.

The origins of the triangular frame harp are unclear. Triangular objects on the laps of seated figures appear in artwork of Ireland, Scotland, England and Wales, as well as other parts of north-west Europe. This page outlines some of the scholarly controversies and disagreements on this subject.

== Scottish origins ==
The connection of Scotland its love of stringed instruments is both ancient and recorded. A bridge thought to be from an Iron Age lyre, and dating to around 300 BC, was discovered on the Isle of Skye which would make it the earliest surviving stringed instrument from western Europe. The earliest descriptions of a European triangular framed harp i.e. harps with a fore pillar are found on carved 8th century Pictish stones. Pictish harps were strung from horsehair. The instruments apparently spread south to the Anglo Saxons who commonly used gut strings and then west to the Gaels of the Highlands and to Ireland. Exactly thirteen depictions of any triangular chordophone instrument from pre-11th-century Europe exist and twelve of them come from Scotland. Moreover, the earliest Irish word for a harp is in fact 'cruit', a word which strongly suggests a Pictish provenance for the instrument. Only two quadrangular instruments occur within the Irish context on the west coast of Scotland and both carvings instruments date two hundred years after the Pictish carvings. The first true representations of the Irish triangular harp do not appear till the late eleventh century in reliquary and the twelfth century on stone and the earliest harps used in Ireland were quadrangular lyres as ecclesiastical instruments, One study suggests Pictish stone carvings may be copied from the Utrecht Psalter, the only other source outside Pictish Scotland to display a Triangular Chordophone instrument. The Utrecht Psalter was penned between 816 and 835 AD, While Pictish Triangular Chordophone carvings found on the Nigg Stone dates from 790–799 AD. and pre-dates the document by up to thirty-five to forty years. Other Pictish sculptures predate the Utrecht Psalter, namely the harper on the Dupplin Cross c. 800 AD.

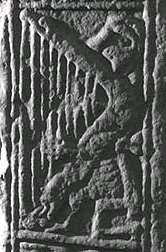
The harper on the Dupplin Cross, Scotland, circa 800 AD

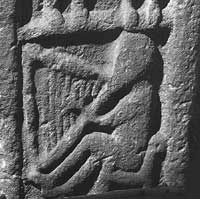
The harper on the Monifeith 4 Pictish sculpture, Scotland, 700–900 AD

== French origins ==
See Rotte for harp lookalike of same period

The earliest drawings of triangular-frame harps appear in the Utrecht Psalter, written and illustrated in the early 9th century from a scriptorium in Rheims. Ten of the illustrations show figures holding harp-like instruments, and in six of them the forepillar is clearly shown. The Utrecht Psalter was penned between 816–835 AD. and found its way to the scriptorium at Christ Church in Canterbury, England 970AD. where several copies were produced. Although portraits of the biblical King David playing a stringed instrument were already a feature of European religious manuscript art, manuscripts before this time show David with a medieval lyre rather than a harp.

=== Harps in the Utrecht Psalter ===
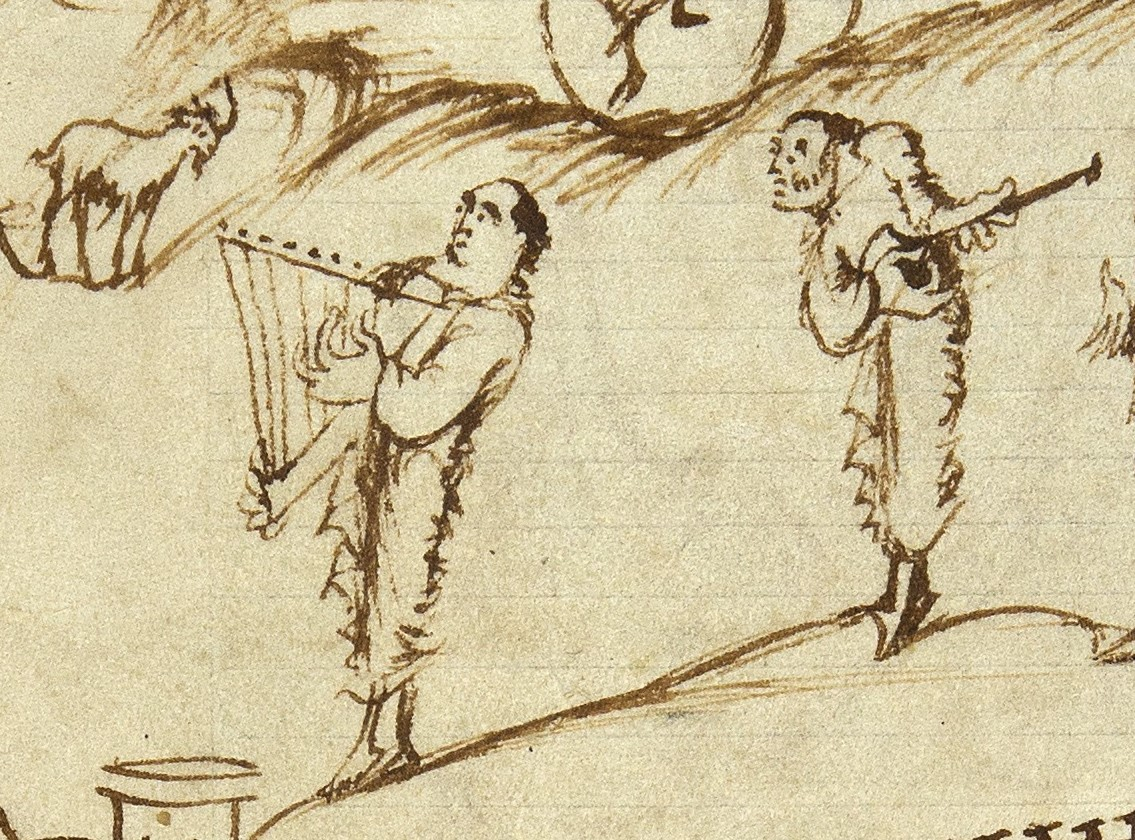
Utrecht Psalter, circa 850 A.D., France, drawn by English scribes during Carolingian Renaissance

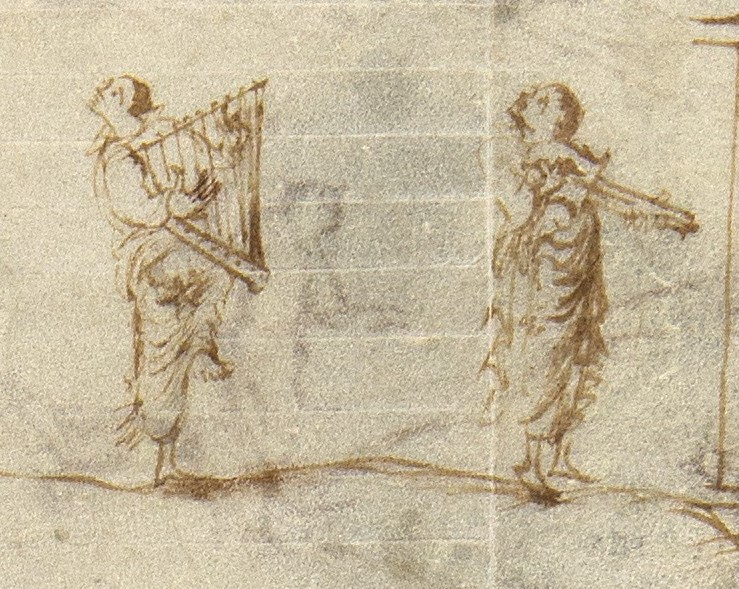
Harp and cythara

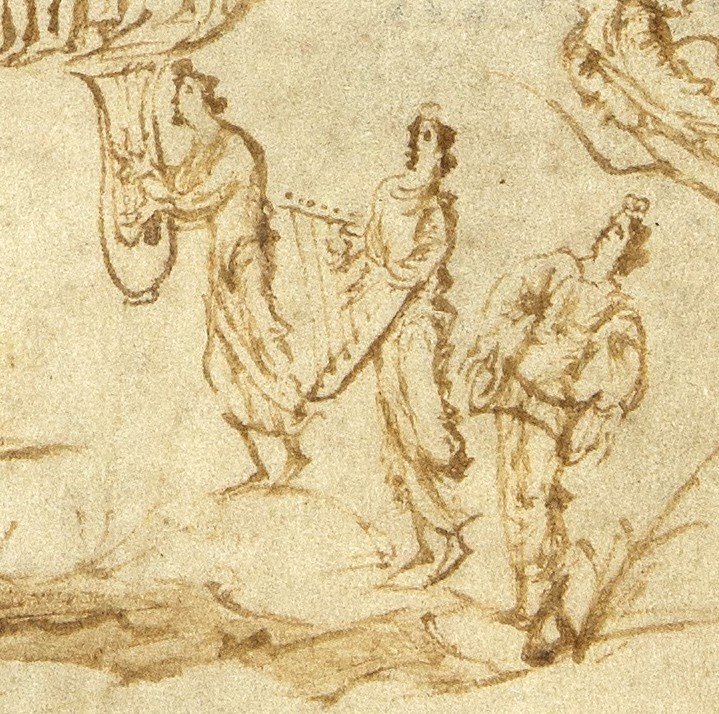
Lyre, harp and hourglass drum

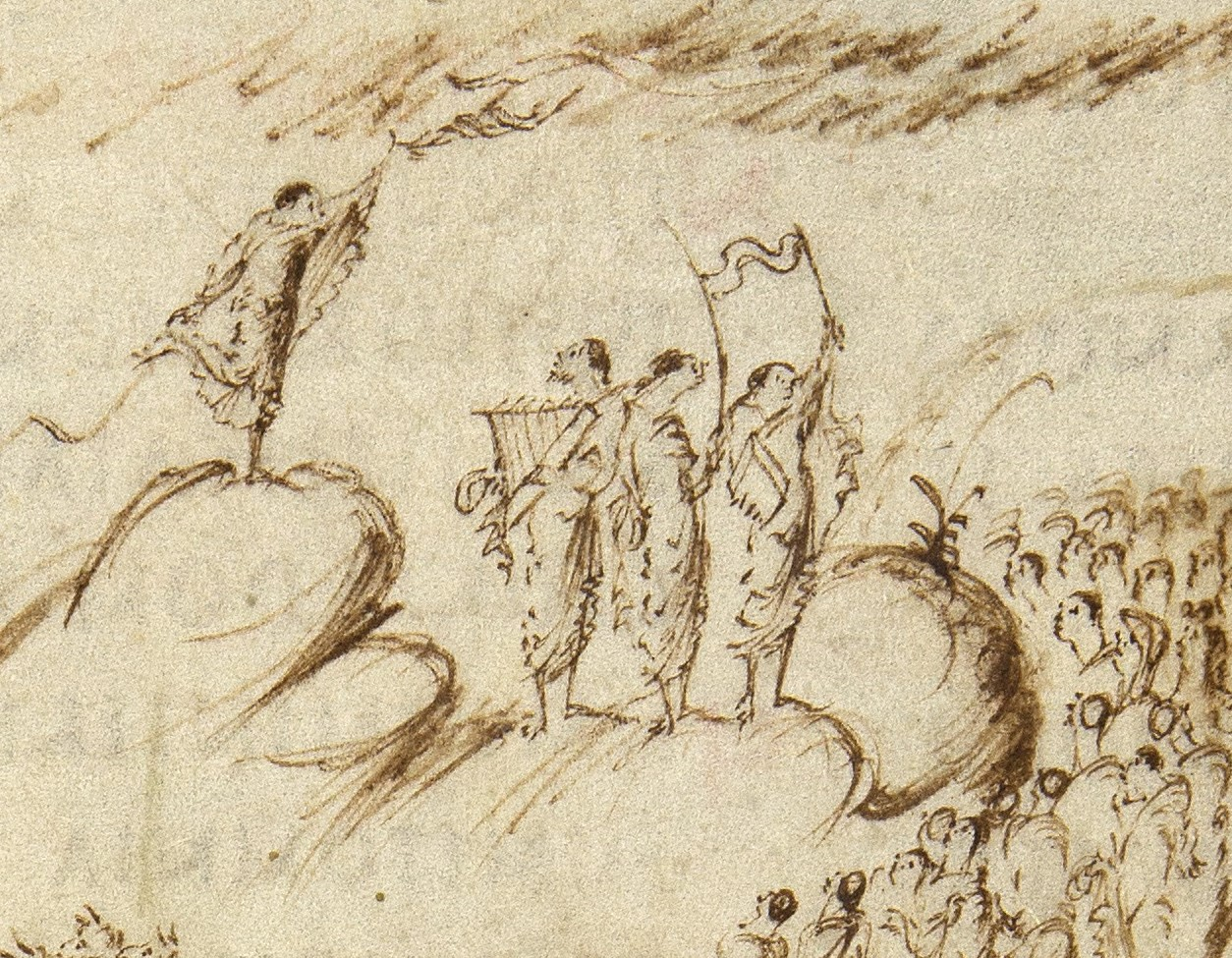
Possibly a harp, but also a possible rotte

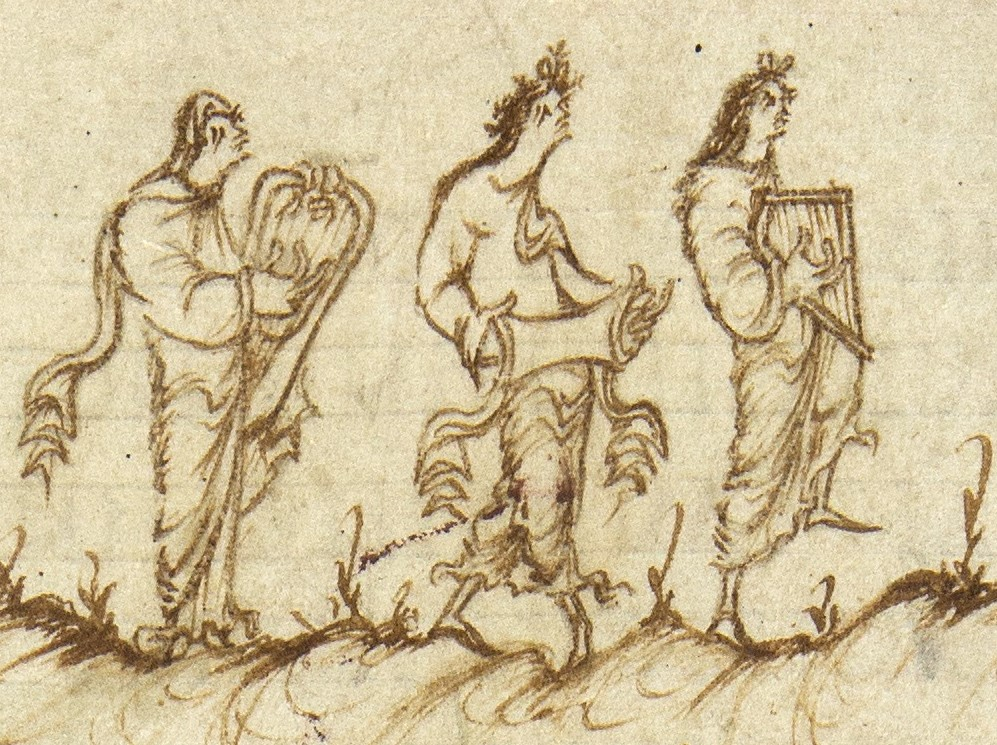
Anglo-Saxon Lyre, hourglass drum, harp

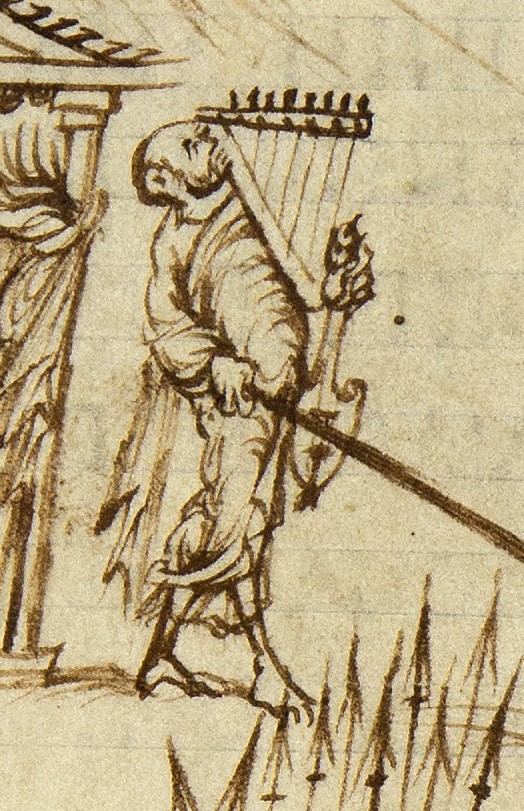
Man holding a harp or rotte, a cythara, and rope.

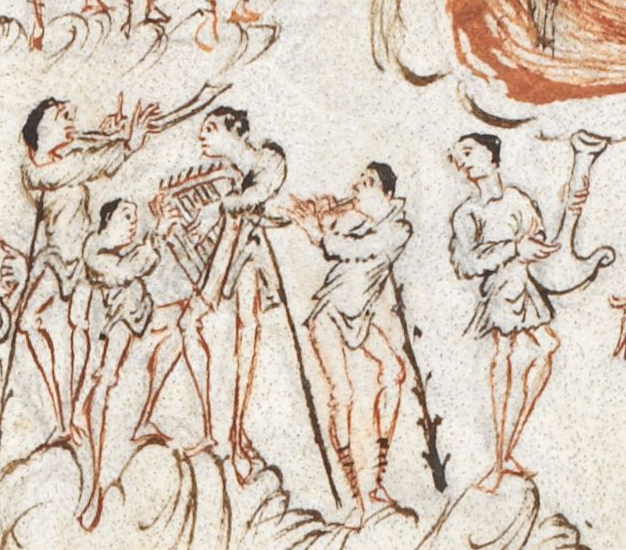
Image from Harley Psalter, 1000-1050 A.D. The English artist, copying Utrecht Psalter, drew harps with more detail; the art possibly showed development of the instrument, or else better knowledge of the artist.

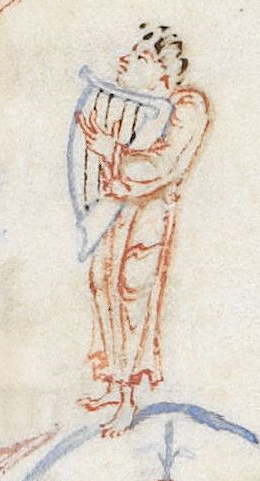
Harper, 11th century A.D., England, from the Harley Psalter folio 28r

== Similar Irish instruments ==
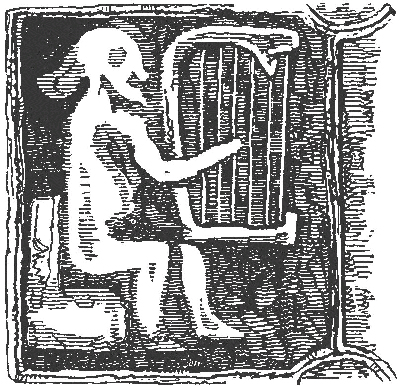
Circa 845 A.D., Ullard harp, carved into the stone High Cross at Ullard Church, County Kilkenny, Ireland. 1905 illustration of sculpture. Called harp, but also resembles a lyre.

The stone carvings attested to Ireland are all found within a Christian context and the majority of carvings depict lyres or quadrangular ecclesiastical instruments that date from the 8th to the 12th century. However lyres are physically different instruments from triangular harps and it is unlikely the characteristic medieval harp developed from them. Early Irish monastic settlements prized the use of lyres within an ecclesiastical setting and the instruments depicted, come in a variety of shapes and sizes and tend to be lyres rather than characteristic triangular harps. Irish hymn texts of the period refer to the performance of hymns and psalms as being accompanied by a lyre and such quadrangular instruments were used in religious ceremonies due to their small size from the introduction of Christianity to Ireland. Gerald of Wales cites the "Cythera" Kithara of St Kevin playing by Irish abbots and bishops for chants and funeral lamentations. Such instruments were prized in Ireland well into the 12th century.

From an Irish perspective, three distinct forms of lyre are evident; round top lyres as seen in the crosses at Ullard shows a quadrangular instrument with no forepillar, and round topped lyres were common throughout northern Europe between the (5th–10th century) as can be seen in surviving examples namely the Sutton Hoo treasure hoard. Curved arm lyres are depicted on the cross of scriptures at Clonmacnoise, the West Cross at Kells, and the Cross at Castle town County Offaly. Oblique lyres are depicted on the South Cross at Kells, the Crosses of Muirdach, and Monasterbonice. The carving at Monasterbonice county Louth does show a type of chloroform triangular instrument, however the stone is weathered and unclear if the figure is playing a true triangular harp, and others think it strongly resembles the Ullard lyre. Another study argue that many such crosses from the pre-Norman period survive in Ireland, however what is striking is that there are no triangular framed harps, Some early texts make the reference coir-cethar-chuir ‘four angled music' which refers to a four sided instrument. Other contemporary Irish sources of the period, namely the Cotton manuscript still depict a plucked lyre correspond to the shrine of St Maelruain Gospel, the Durrow Cross lyre and the three stringed lyre carving of judgement of Solomon at Ardmore Cathedral.

The first true representations of the Irish triangular harp does not appear till the late 11th century in reliquary on the St. Moedoc shrine, while the Gospel of St Maelruain from the same period still traditionally depicts a lyre with three strings. Other articles discuss the triangular harp was first appeared in Ireland at the start of the Anglo-Norman invasion. The influx of English harpers to Ireland is also recorded in the Red Book of Ormond, and the Dublin Merchant roll (c1190-1265) shows a contingent of English Anglo-Norman harpers within an Irish context, playing in the Anglo-Norman tradition. Although, it is clear these musicians were playing a triangular English harp as seen by a sketch in the margin of the Harper Thomas Le Harpur (c1200), it is unclear if such an influx lead to a possible cross pollination between the invading Anglo-Norman and Irish harpers.

== Pre-European origins ==
The knowledge and designs of harps and lyres probably arrived in ancient Europe via Grecian regions from the ancient Middle-East. (Note: For example, a five-thousand-year-old Sumerian lyre on display in the "Mesopotamian section". British Museum (britishmuseum.org) (photo gallery).) This may have been happened as early as in the peak times of the Celtic civilization, as suggested by the lyre fragment found at the High Pasture Cave site, dated to approximately 300 BCE. It is not unreasonable to draw a connection between this finding and the extended contacts that Celtic peoples, at their greatest expansion in the 4th century BCE, had with southeastern Europe, where lyres and similar instruments were widespread, and even more precisely, to the migration of Celtic tribes (Galatians) to Anatolia of 278 BCE. (Note: Recall that Orpheus, the archetypal lyre-player in Greek mythology, was a native of Thrace, a region on the overland-route between Greece and Anatolia.)

== Bibliography ==
- John Bannerman, "The Clàrsach and the Clàrsair", in Scottish Studies, vol. 30 no. 3, 1991
- Keith Sanger and Alison Kinnaird, "Tree of Strings – Crann nan Teud", Kinmor 1992
- Seamus Roch Ryan, "The Sound of Revolution" 2006
- Henry George Farmer (1947). A History of Music in Scotland London, 1947 p. 280
- Roslyn Rensch (1989). Harps and Harpists Indiana University Press, 1989 pp. 125–127
- Francis Collinson (1966). The Bagpipe, Fiddle and Harp. from Traditional and National Music of Scotland, Routledge & Kegan Paul, reprinted by Lang Syne Publishers Ltd., 1983
