= Rotte (psaltery) =

Medieval stringed musical instrument

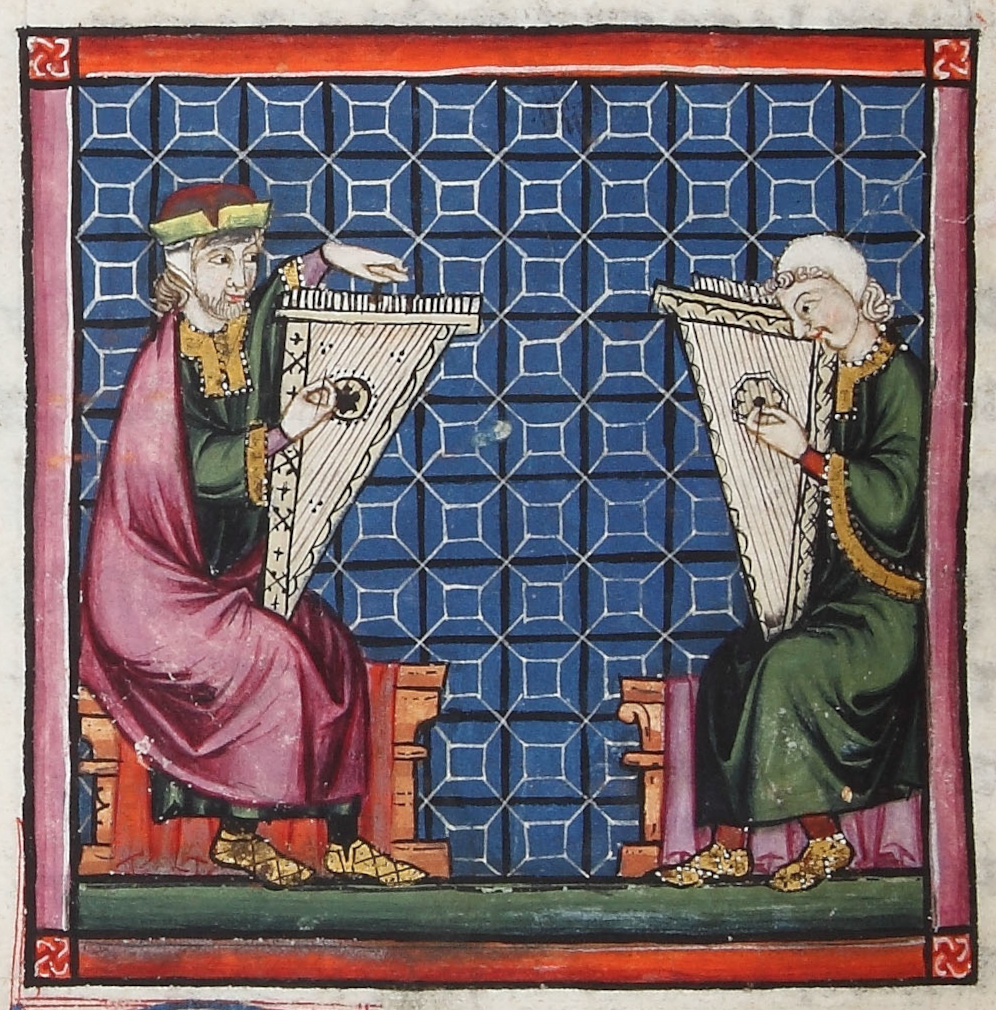
- Triangular psalteries held as harps in the Cantigas de Santa Maria, Musician's Codex, 1280 A.D. On the near face of each rotte, 17 strings are visible.

String instrument
- Other names: rotte, rote, rotta, rota
- Hornbostel–Sachs classification: 314.122 box zithers ((Box zither. Chordophone with one or more strings stretched between fixed points, a board for a string bearer, parallel to the plane of the strings, with a resonator box))

Related instruments
- Psaltery; Baltic psaltery

See Rotte (lyre) for the medieval lyre, or Rote for the fiddle

During the 11th to 15th century A.D., rotte (German) or rota (Spanish) referred to a triangular psaltery illustrated in the hands of King David and played by jongleurs (popular musicians who might play the music of troubadours) and cytharistas (Latin word for a musician who plays string instruments). Besides being played in popular music, the church may have used them as well; a letter from Cuthbert, Abbot of Jarrow, England survives, in which he asks an archbishop to send him a cytharista to play the rotta.

The instruments least 10 strings on each side and were held like a harp in front of the musician. Rottes were also described as having either 17 strings or 22 strings on each side. The playing position was different from other psalteries, as the Rotte might be held like a harp, leaned sideways (flat against the musician's chest), or rested on the lap. Two styles of rotte have been inferred from images: the first is a triangular box with strings on one side, the other has strings on both sides (both hands playing at once, resembling a harp). The instruments are shown played with both plectrum and with fingers.

The names chrotta, rotte, rotta, rota and rote have been applied to different stringed instruments, including a psaltery, lyre and to a Crwth (necked lyre played as a fiddle or lute). In the 15th century it was also used to name a fiddle, synonymous with the rebec.

Knowing a rotte (psaltery) from a triangular harp in the medieval miniatures can be challenging; rottes may have sound holes visible, if the artist is putting that level of detail into the painting. Similarly, harps show background through the strings if the artist painted sufficient detail.

== Harp versus zither ==
See Psaltery for more versions & Ancient Greek harps for earlier psalterion

Another complication in interpreting images involves the writers and artist from the past. The artists and church in the 4th-5th centuries A.D. wrote about a triangular-shaped psalterium, holy to them because the 3 sides represented the Trinity. This fondness for the idea of the psalterium didn't overcome the early church's (1st-2nd century A.D.) overall program of shunning the use of musical instruments, which they associated with paganism. They were so successful in this that the harp was largely unknown in Christian Europe for centuries. In the Carolingian Renaissance, they looked at images and descriptions of the triangular-shaped psalterium and didn't realize that it was an "open, vertical, angular harp" of Asian style, once familiar to Christians. These religious academics understood the contemporary (for them) rotte triangular psaltery, which they illustrated in the hands of King David, but they did not understand the details of the ancient psalterium (Ancient Greek harp).

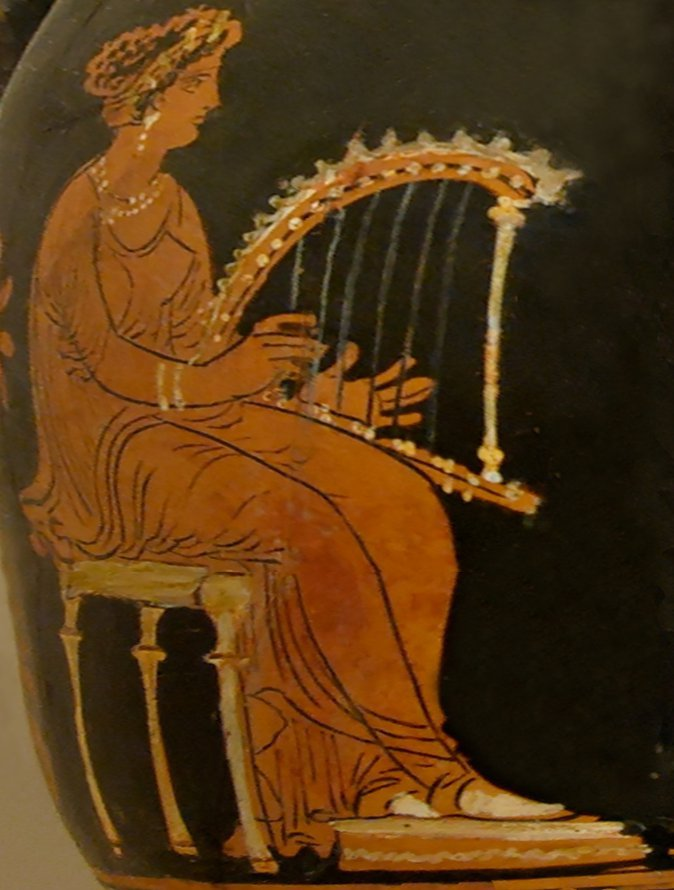
Woman playing triangular frame-harp, a psaltērion or trigōnon, in red-figure pottery from Apulia, ca. 320–310 BC C. Anzi (British Museum).

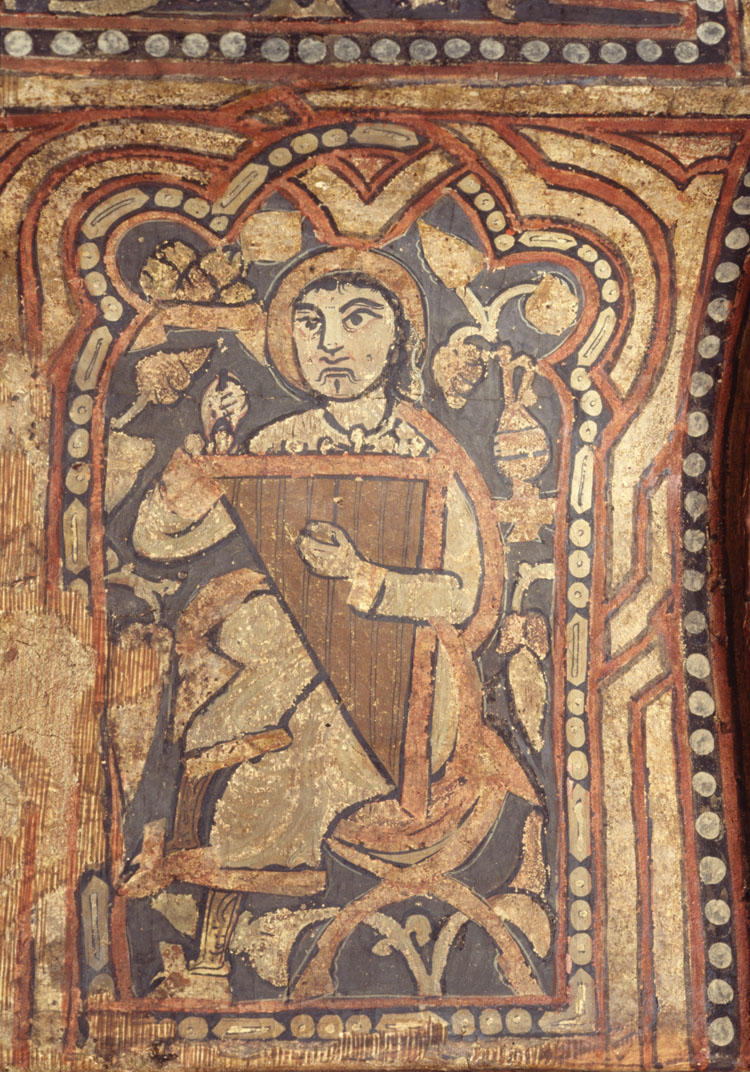
Likely psaltery, as no sound holes are visible. Solid wood color and lack of detail between strings also indicate this is not a harp. Palatine Chapel, circa 1140 A.D.

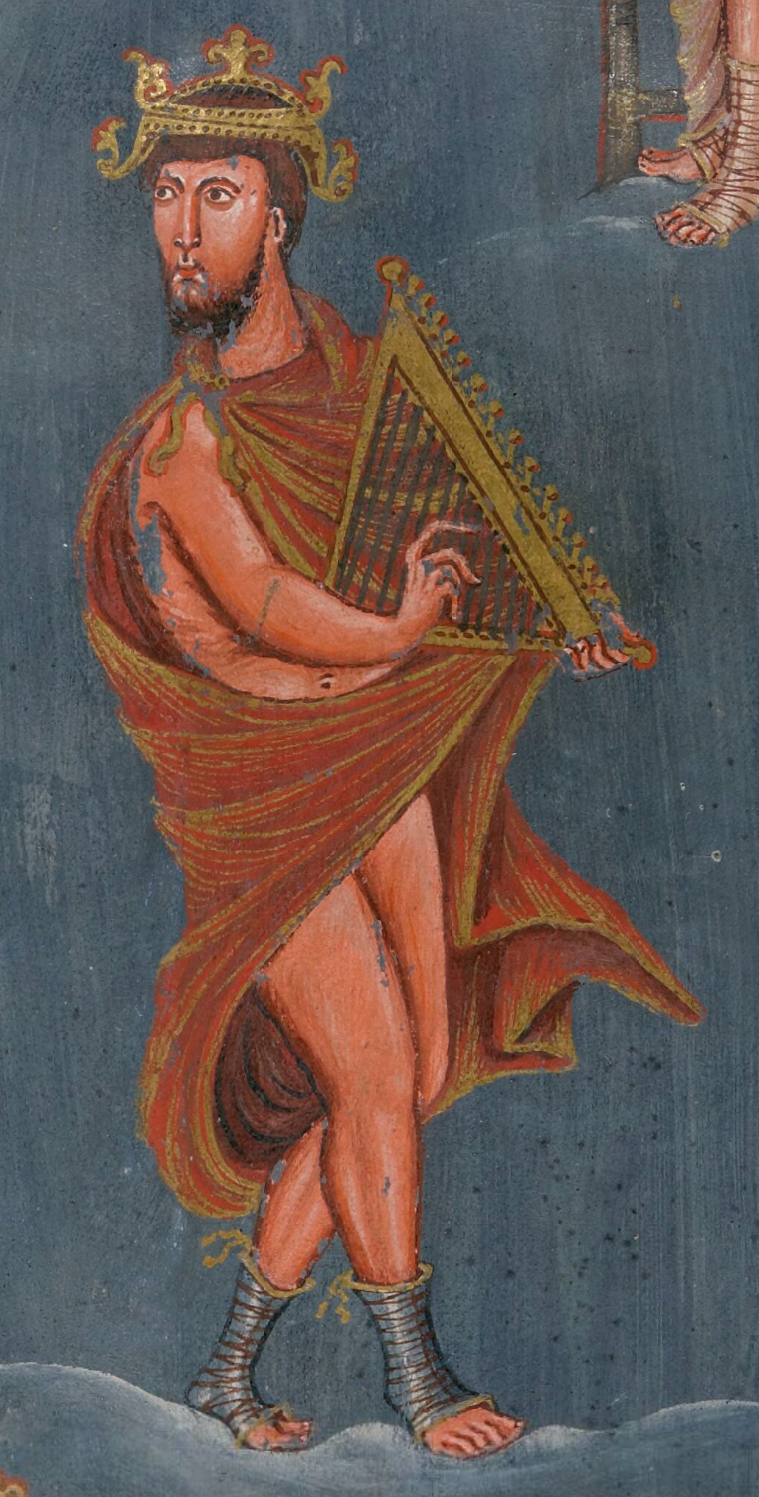
Detail visible through the harp stings. First Bible of Charles the Bald, 9th century A.D. The harp in this picture has been called "an unreal psaltery in the form of an almost equilateral triangle," an attempt to illustrate ancient instruments from the Bible, by 9th-10th century Europeans.

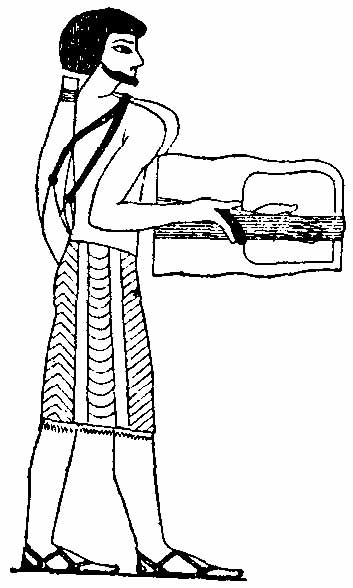
Rotta applied in the 20th century to an ancient musical instrument in lyre form, in transition to become a cythara lute or crwth-style fiddle.

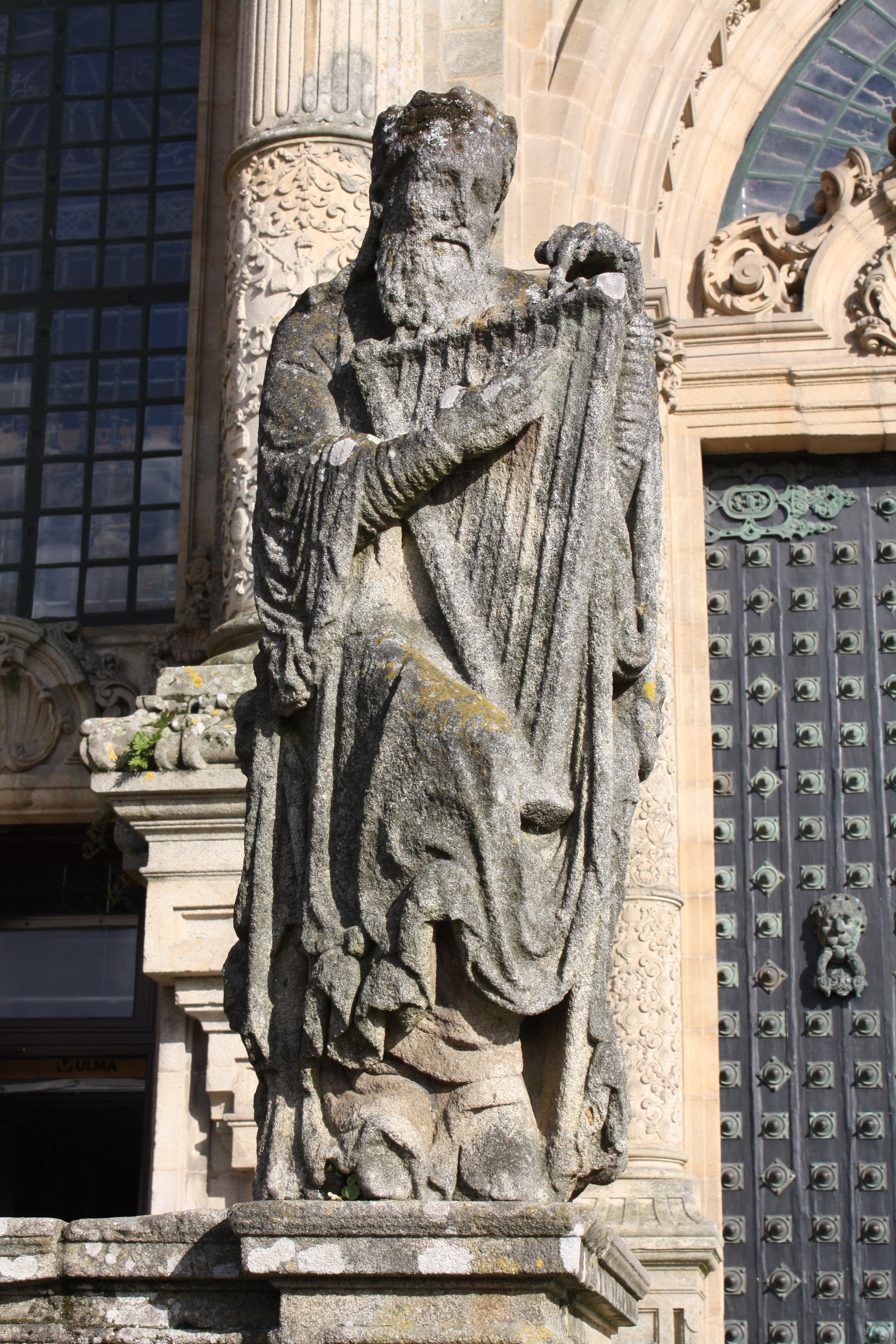
1168 to 1211 A.D. Sculpture by Master Mateo of David playing probable rotte (by this era, harps had a different shape). Instrument is similar to those drawn in Utrecht Psalter.

== Harps in Europe ==
See Origin of the harp in Europe

According to the New Grove Encyclopedia of Musical Instruments, there are no evidence in images or sculpture to "suggest the existence of harps in western Europe" between the 4th century BCE and the 8th century CE. "Triangular harps" can be seen in manuscript miniatures and in sculpture starting about 900 A.D. Ancient examples in "Italo-Greek" vases in the 5th to 4th centuries BCE depict Asian harps. Christian art furnished examples of the existence of the harp in the late 8th to early 10th century CE, in the Dagulf Psalter made in Aachen and the Utrecht Psalter. The Harley Psalter copied the Utrecht Psalter, but the artist changed the look of the instruments.

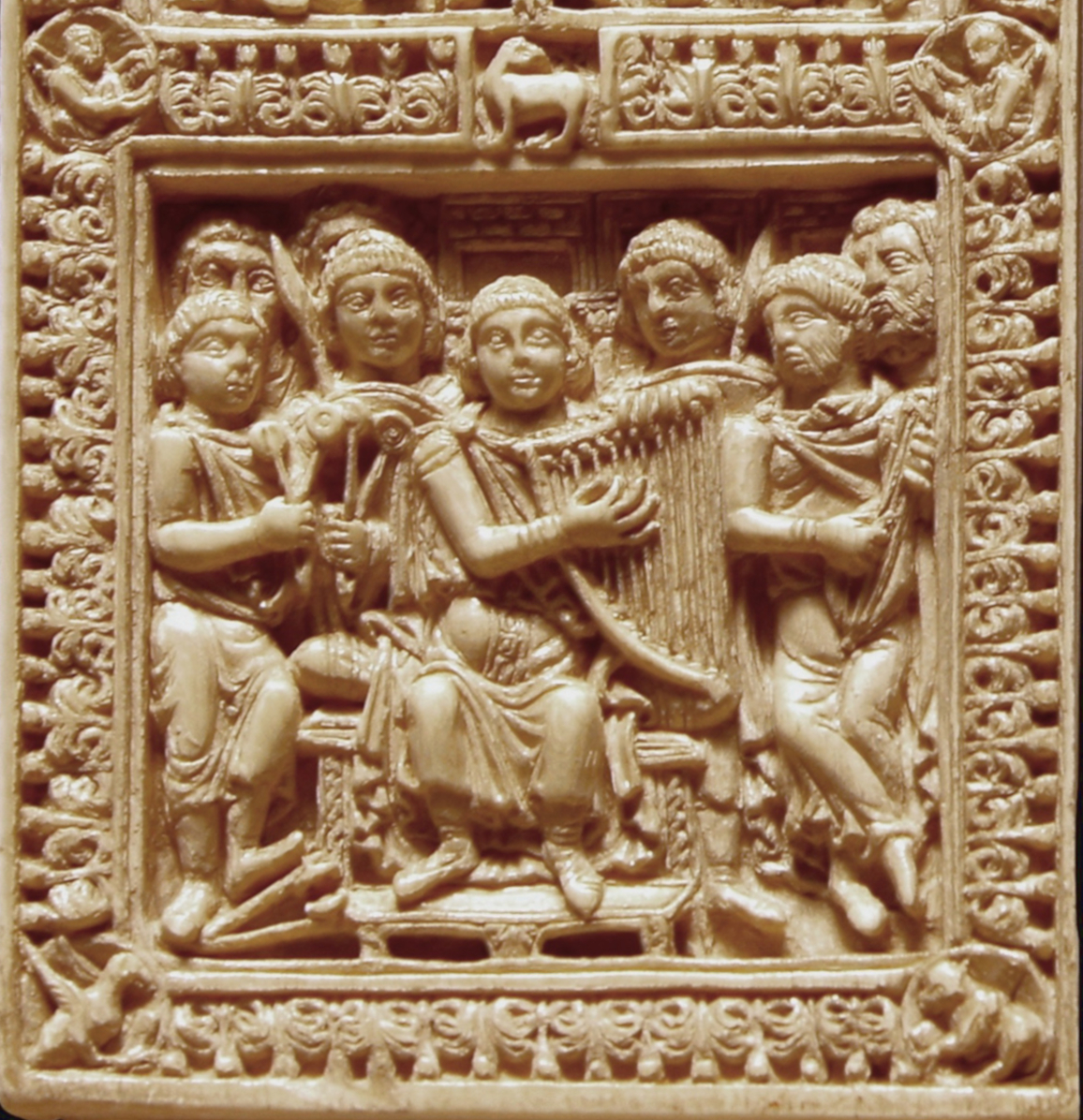
Dagulf Psalter, artwork for cover, late 8th century CE

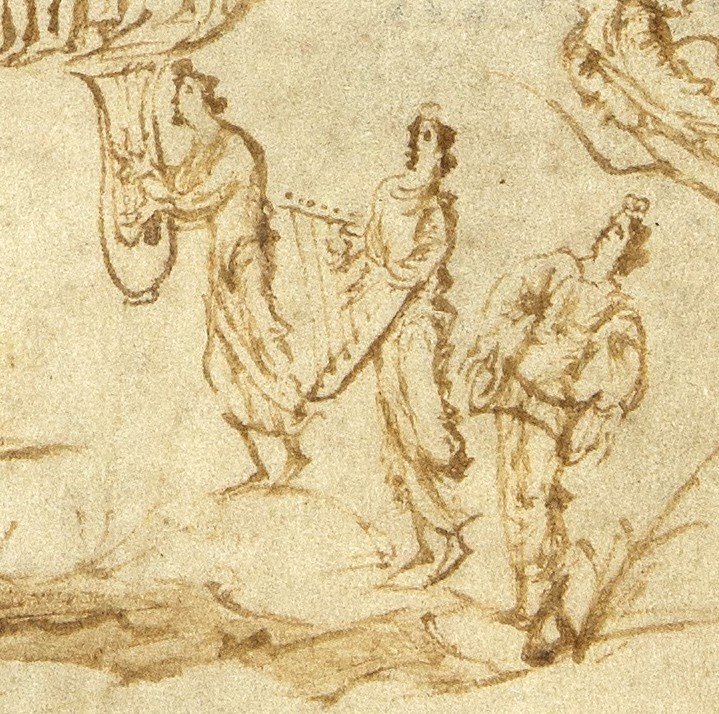
Utrecht Psalter. Harp; both hands are visible through the strings.

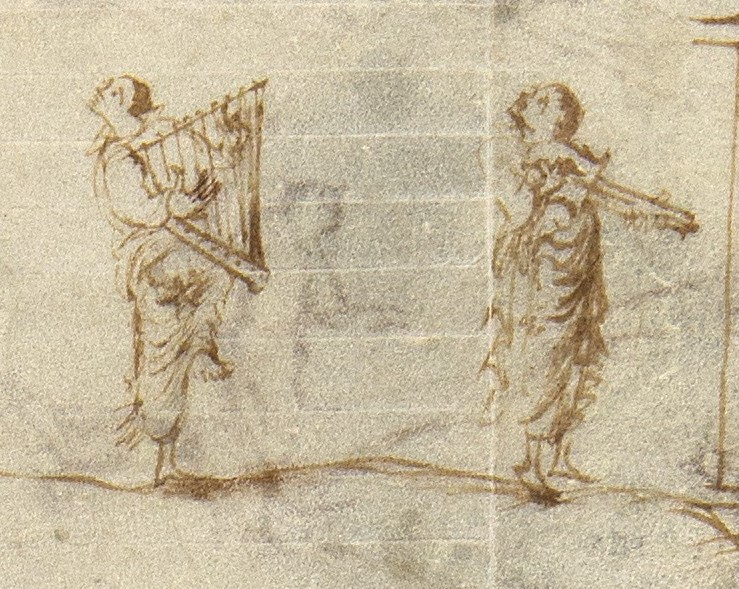
Utrecht Psalter. This is a harp, because the far hand is visible through the strings.

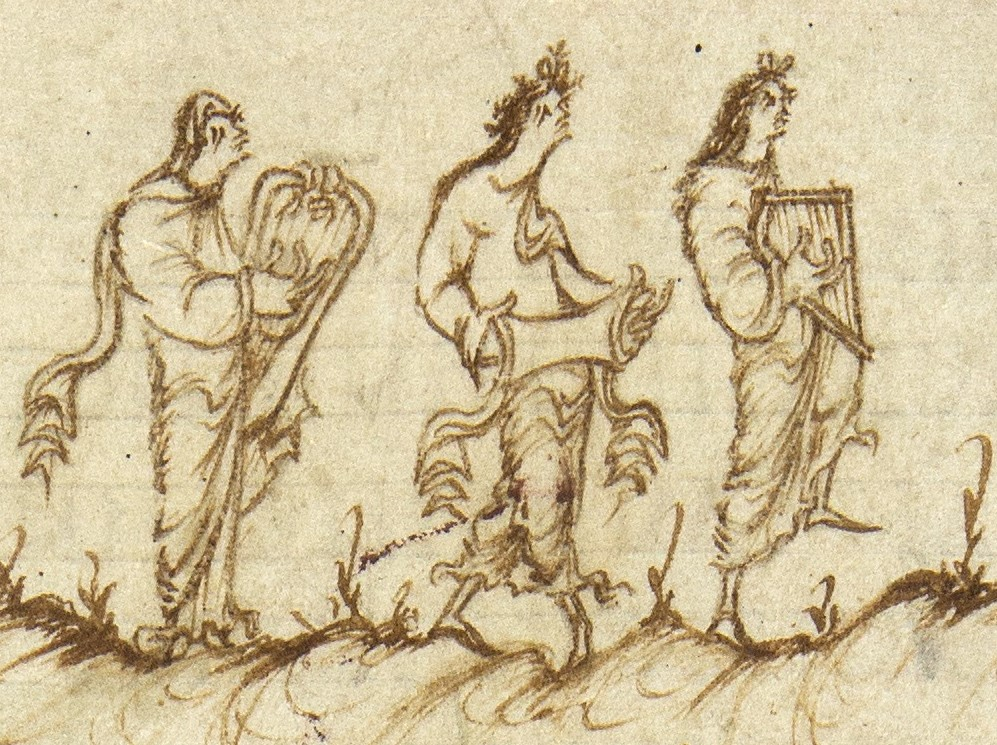
Both lyre and harp visible

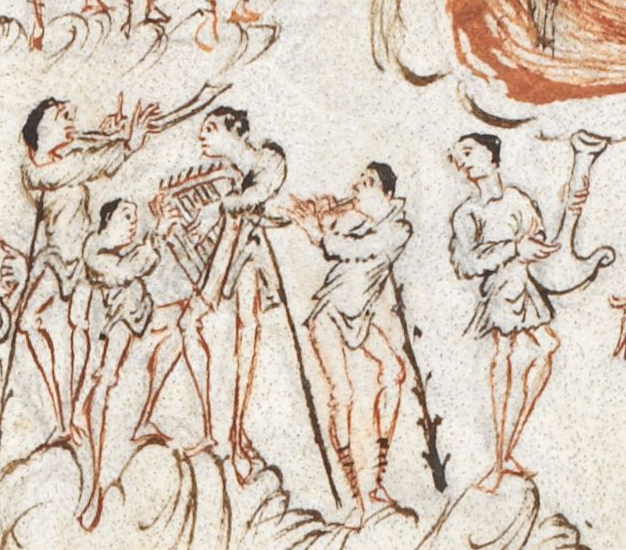
Harley Psalter, in which the harp is shown with better detail

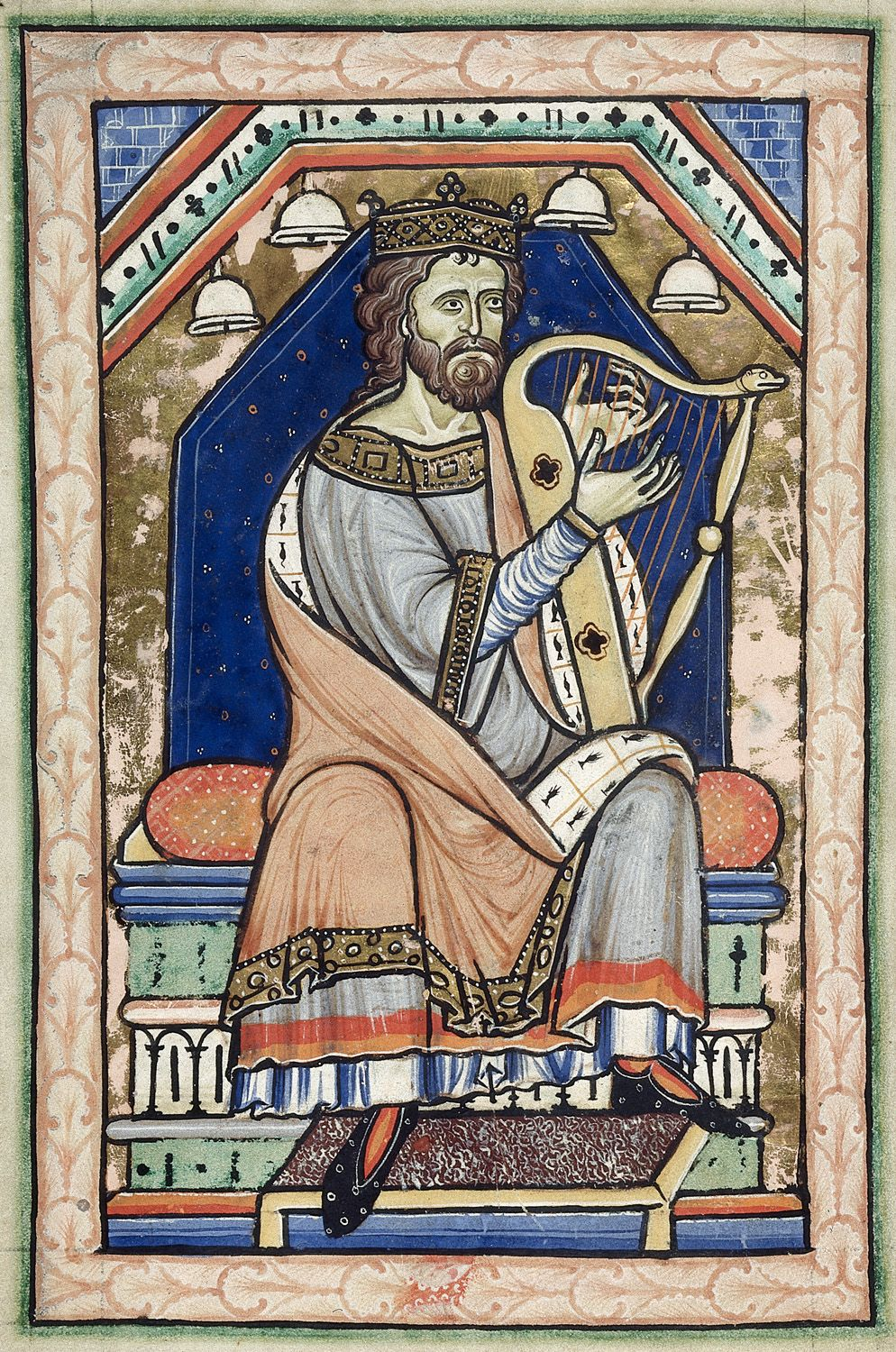
circa 1200 A.D. David playing European harp.

== Rottes ==
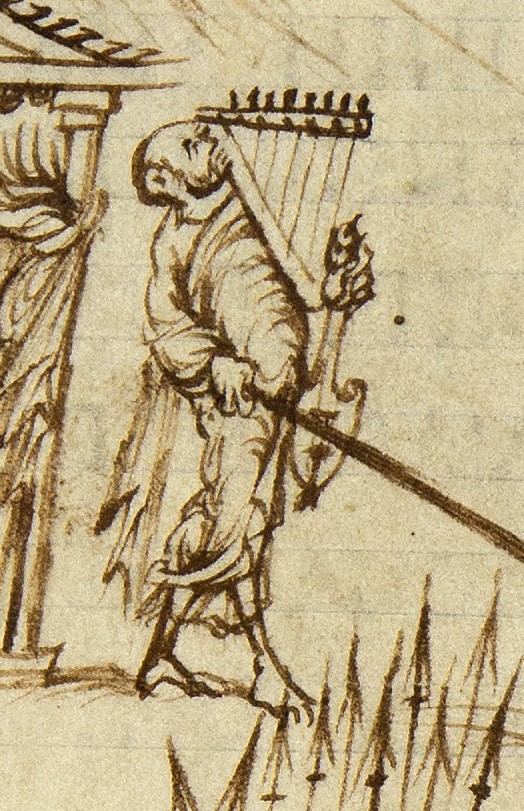
850 A.D., Utrecht Psalter. Cited as the "first representation" of a rotte along with a spade-shaped lute.

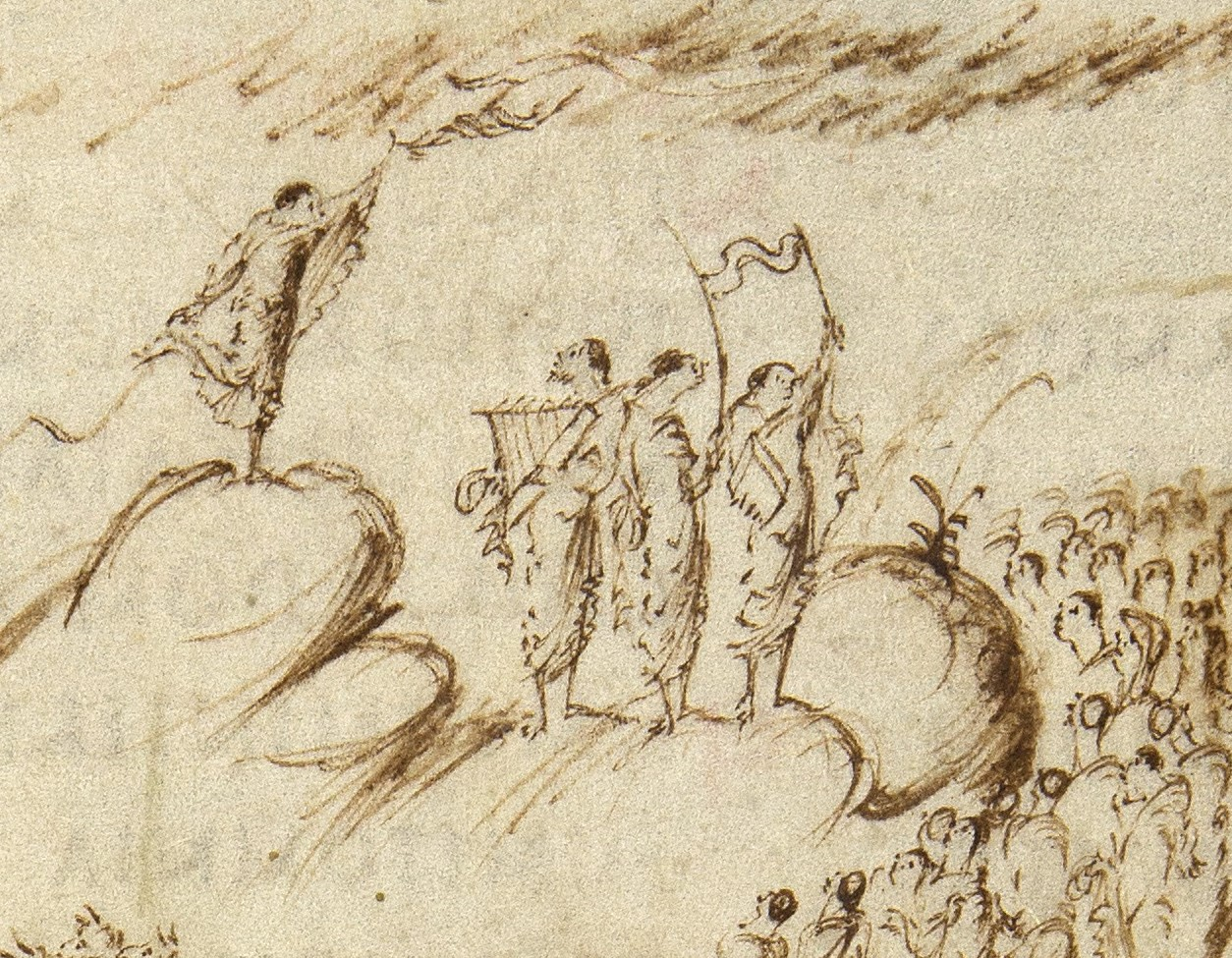
850 A.D., Utrecht Psalter. Unable to see detail through strings.

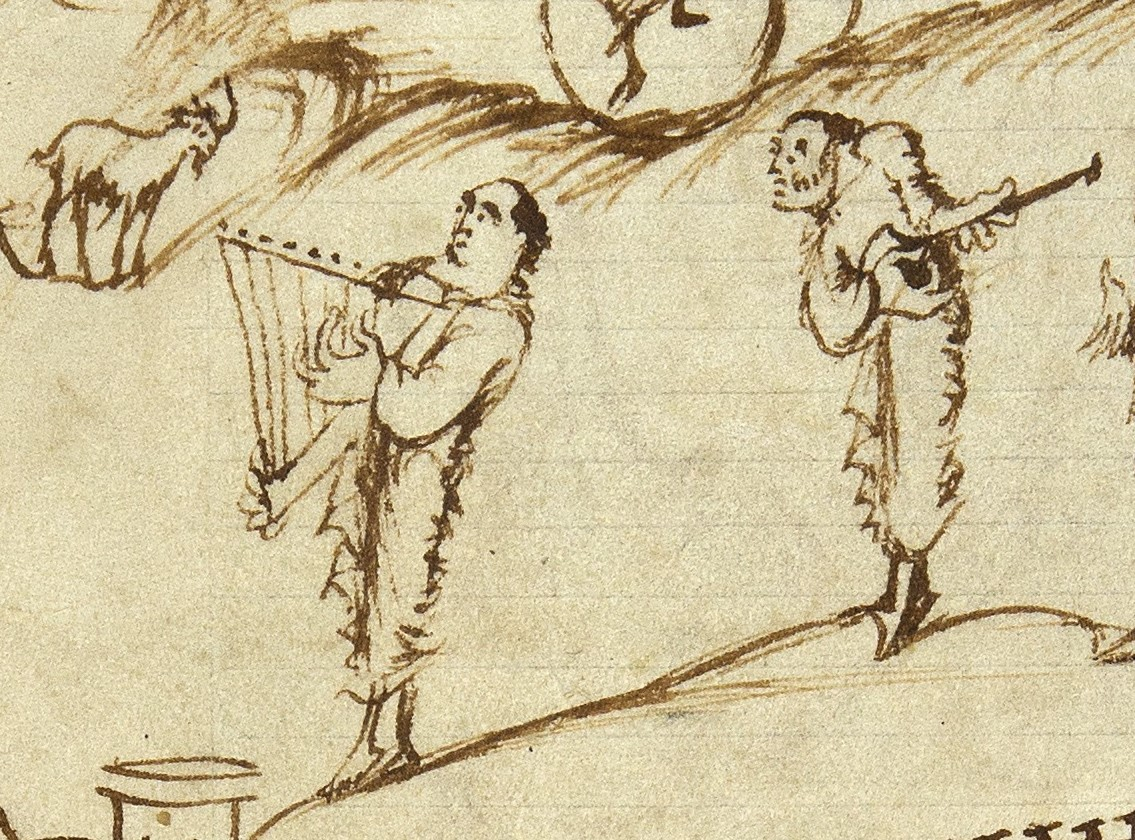
850 A.D., Utrecht Psalter. Unable to see detail through strings.

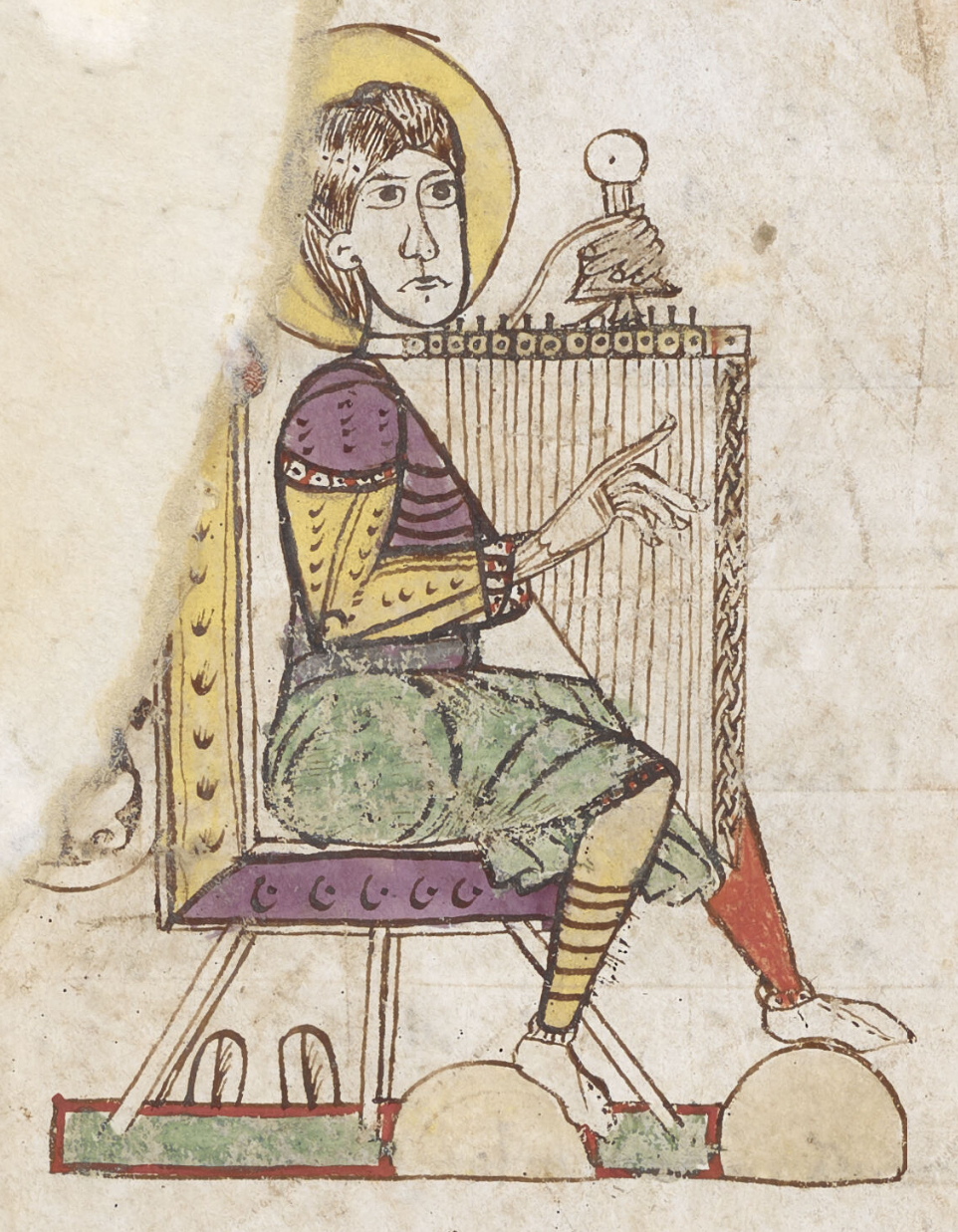
11th century A.D., Toulouse, France. Rotte from harley ms 4951 folio 295v

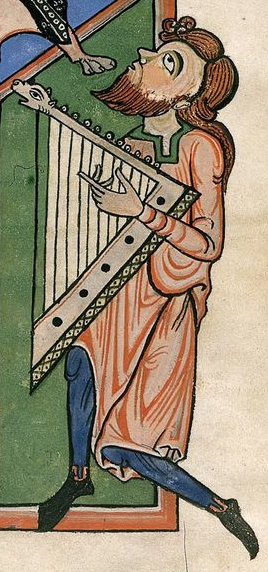
Rota, from the Harley MS 2804 from the Worms Bible, Germany 1025-1075 A.D.

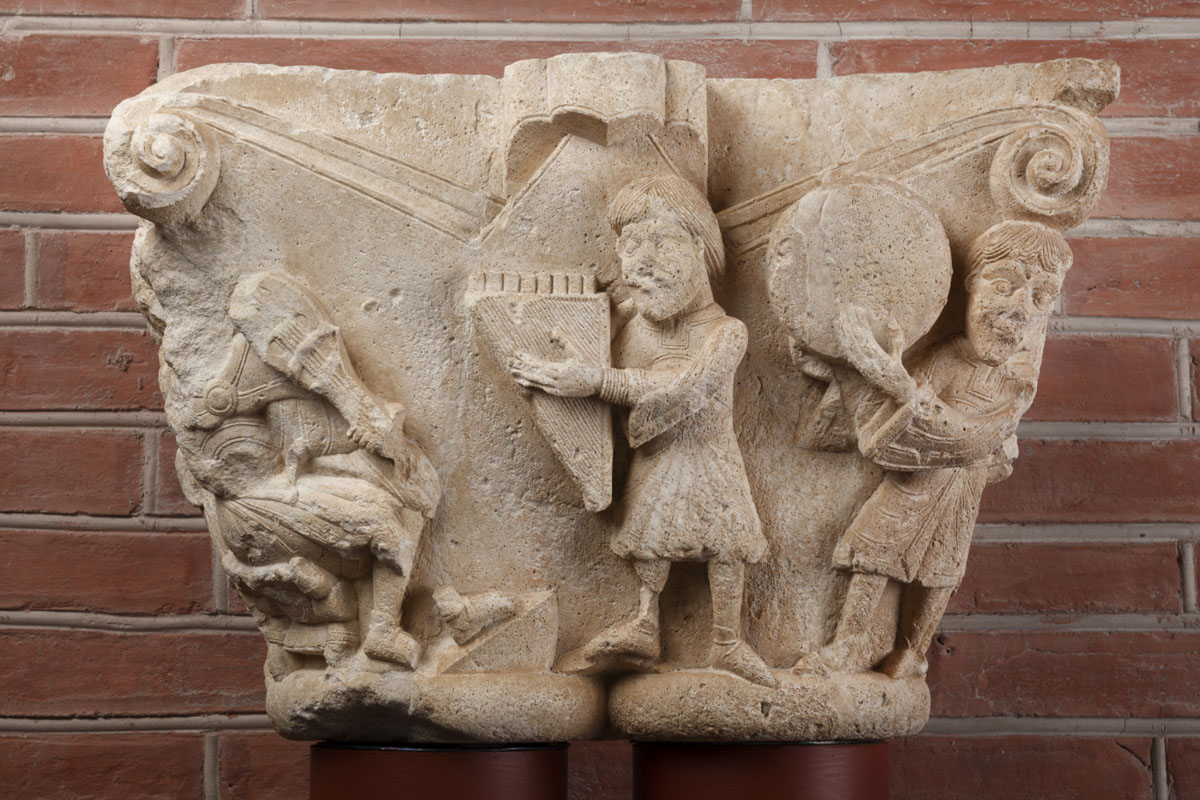
12th century A.D., France, at the cloister of the priory of La Daurade in Toulouse. King David and his musicians

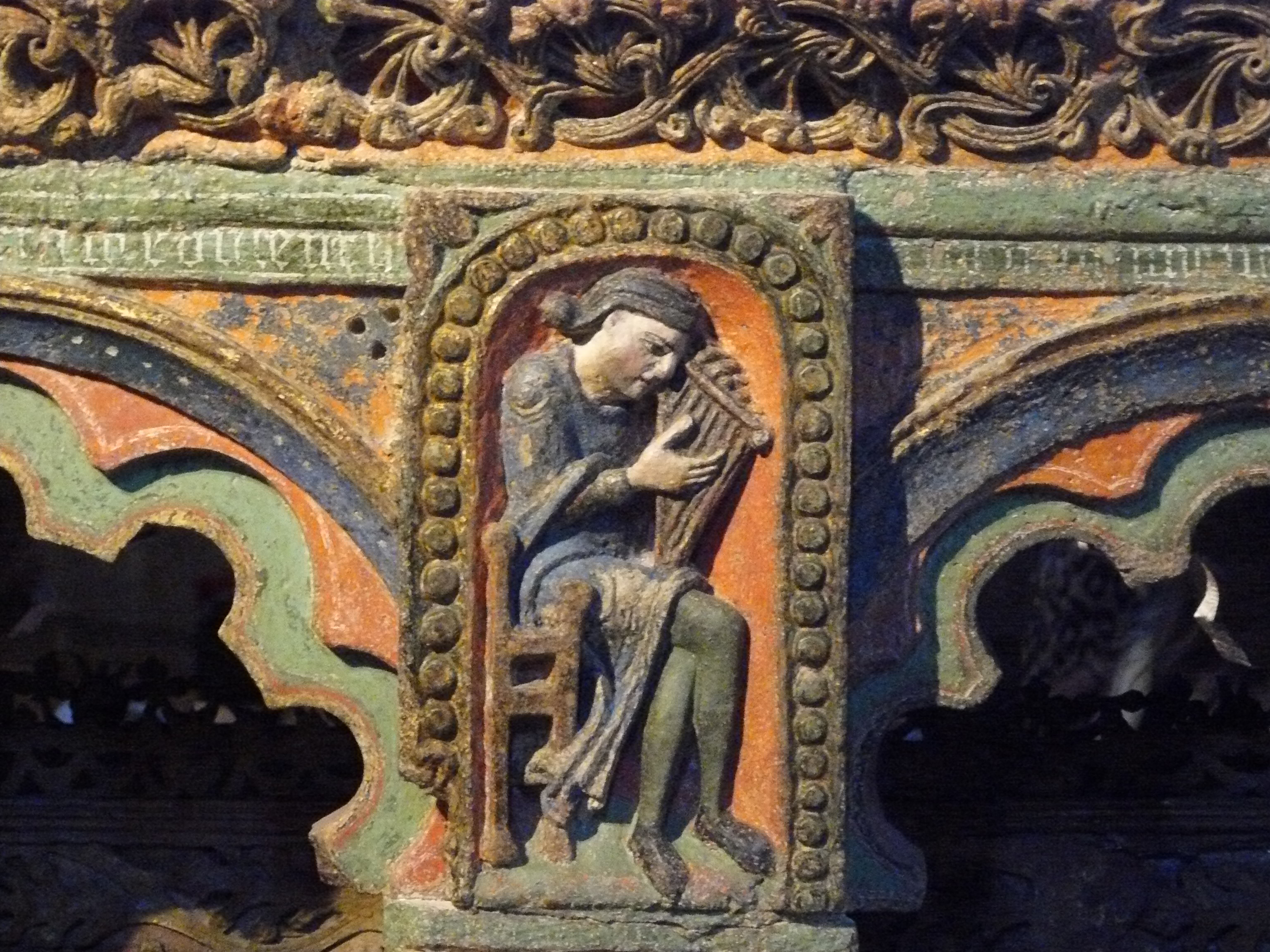
1150-1200 A.D., Spain, Basilica de San Vincente. Man playing the rota, from the Cenotaph of Saints Vicente, Sabina and Cristeta.

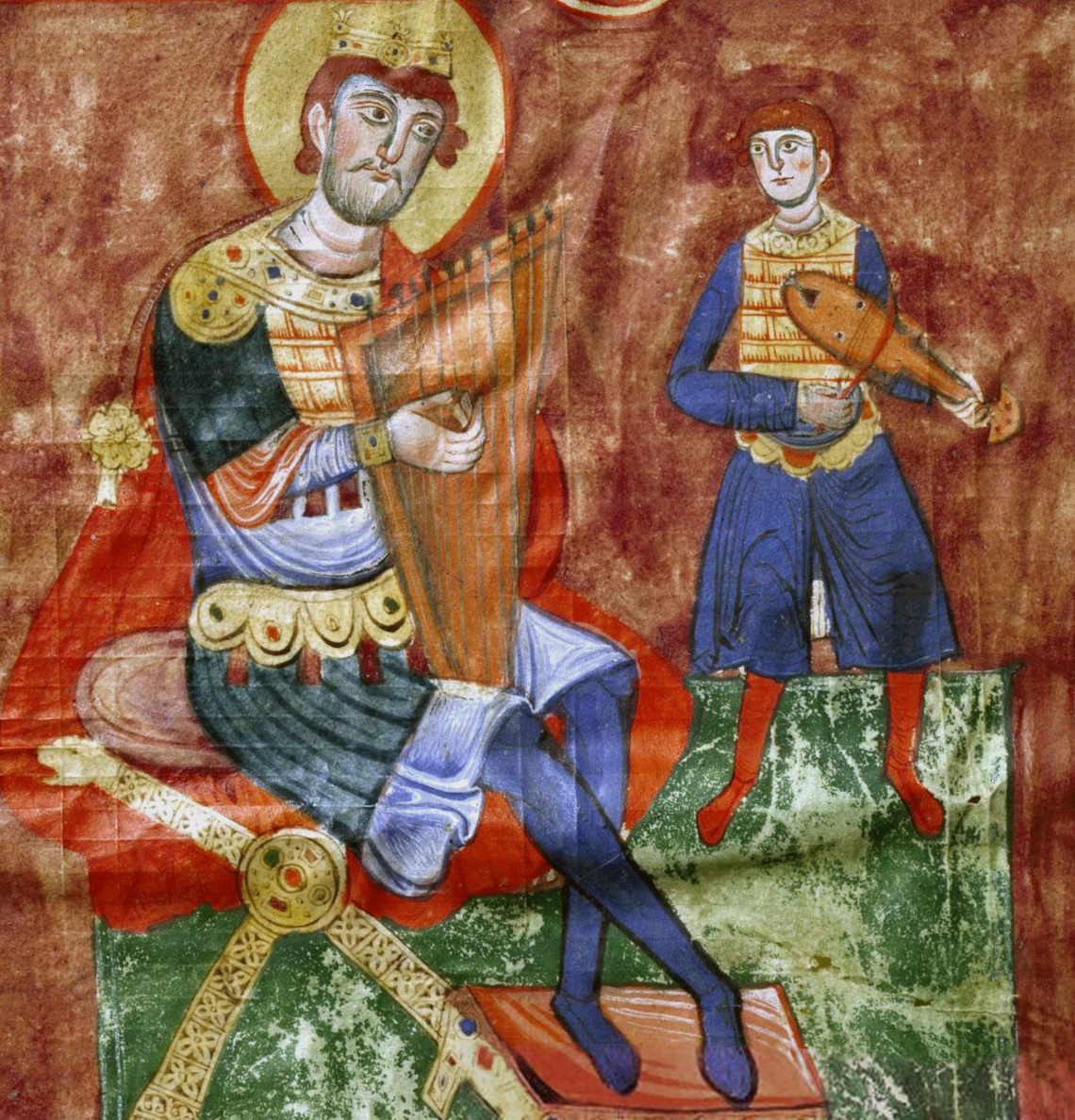
Circa 1100 A.D., Italy. King David playing rotte accompanied by a man playing fiddle, from the Psalter of Polirone, Mantua, Teresiana Library, ms. 340, f. 1v-2r

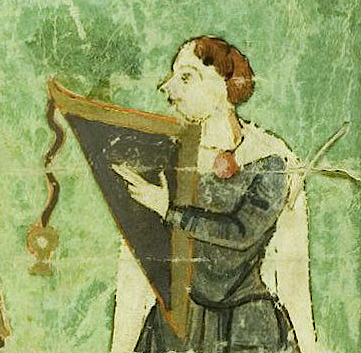
Circa 1075-1100 A.D., Lower Saxony. Rotte psaltery from Klosterneuburg, Augustinian Canonry, Cod. 987 'Prayer book of Leopold the Saint'

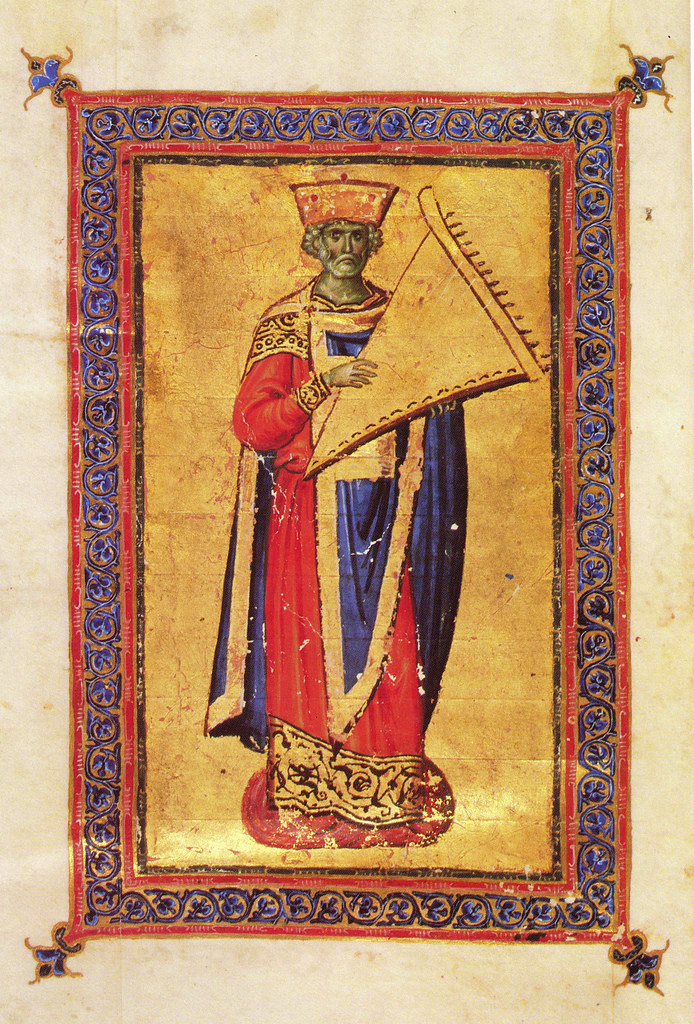
12th century A.D., Greece. King David playing rota, from the Stavronikita monastery, Stavronikita Ms No 46

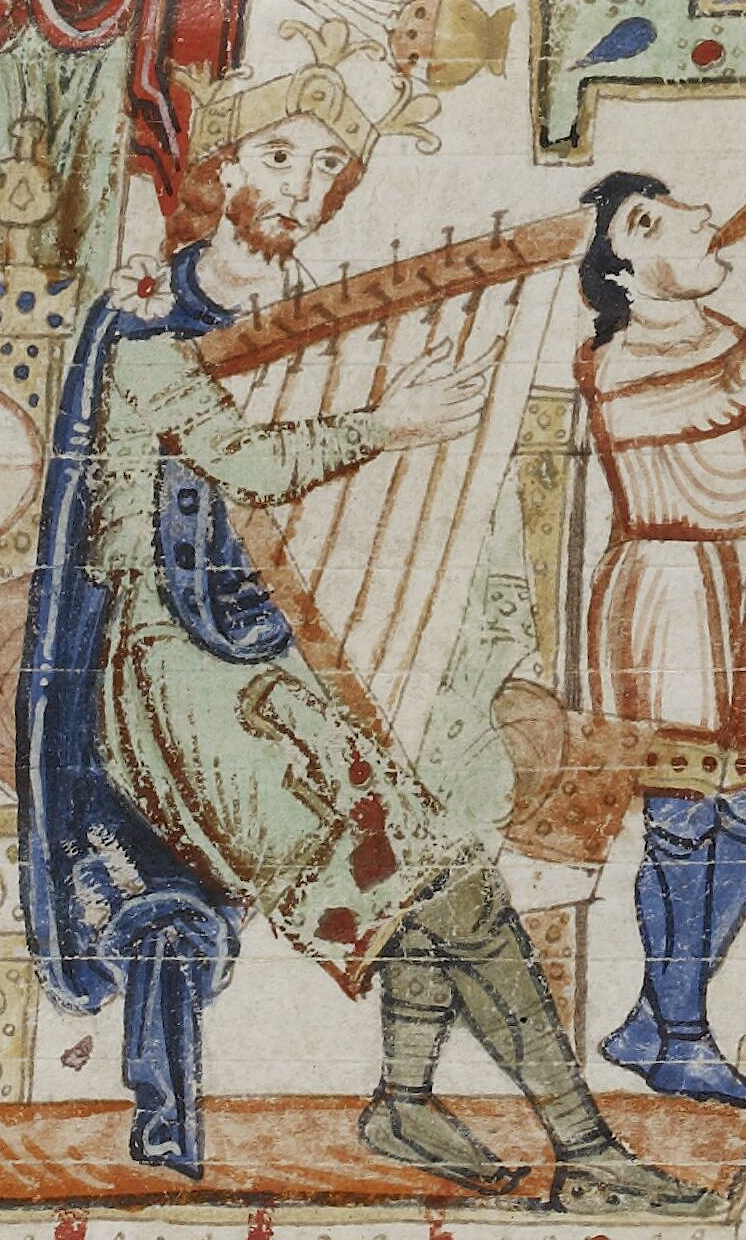
1125 A.D., Italy. King David with a rotte.

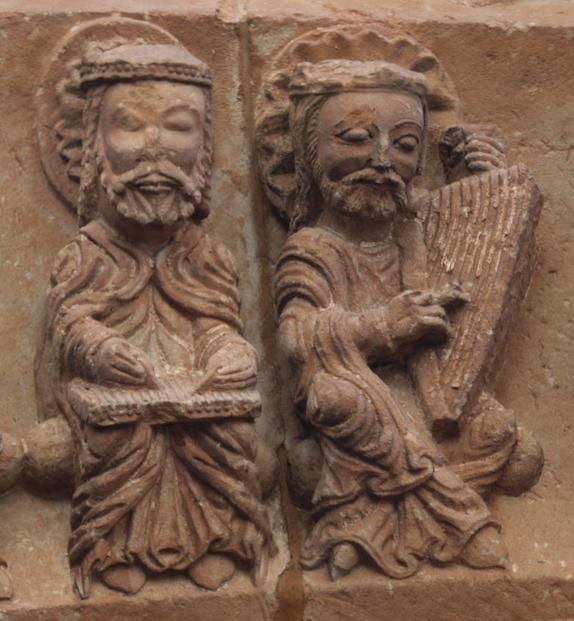
12th century, Spain. Two of the 24 Elders of the Apocalypse with a psaltery and rota, Santo Domingo de Soria.

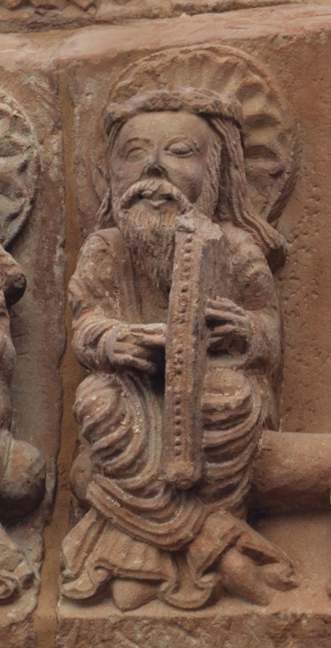
12th century A.D., Spain. One of the 24 Elders of the Apocalypse with a rota, Santo Domingo de Soria.

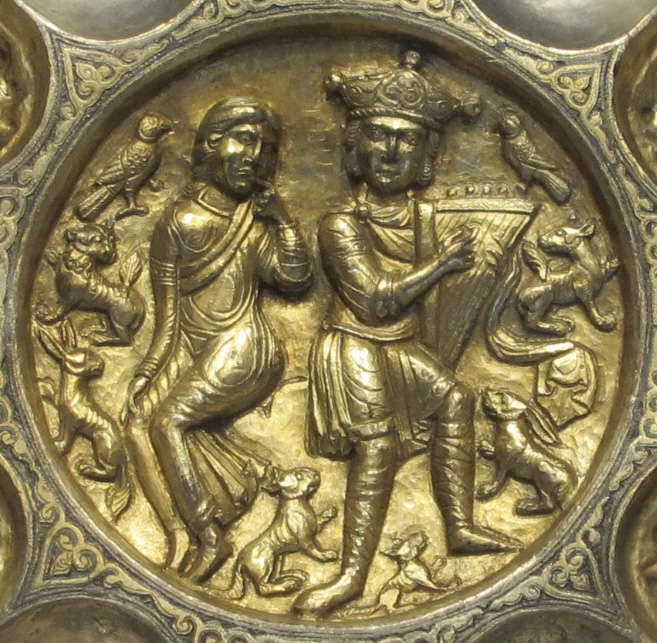
1150-1159 A.D., Armenian Kingdom of Cilicia. Digenes Akritas and his wife Eydokia, from romance story Digenes Akritas. Digenes playing a rotta or possibly harp. His far hand grips the outside of the instrument, making it appear solid like a rotta.

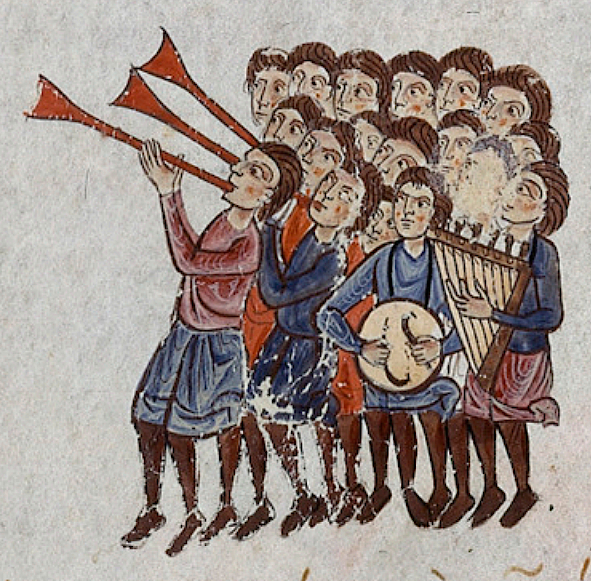
13th century, Palermo Sicily. Musicians playing rota, busines and drum welcome Emperor Nikephoros II Phokas, from Skylitzes Chronicle (Cod. Vitr. 26-2, folio 145b)

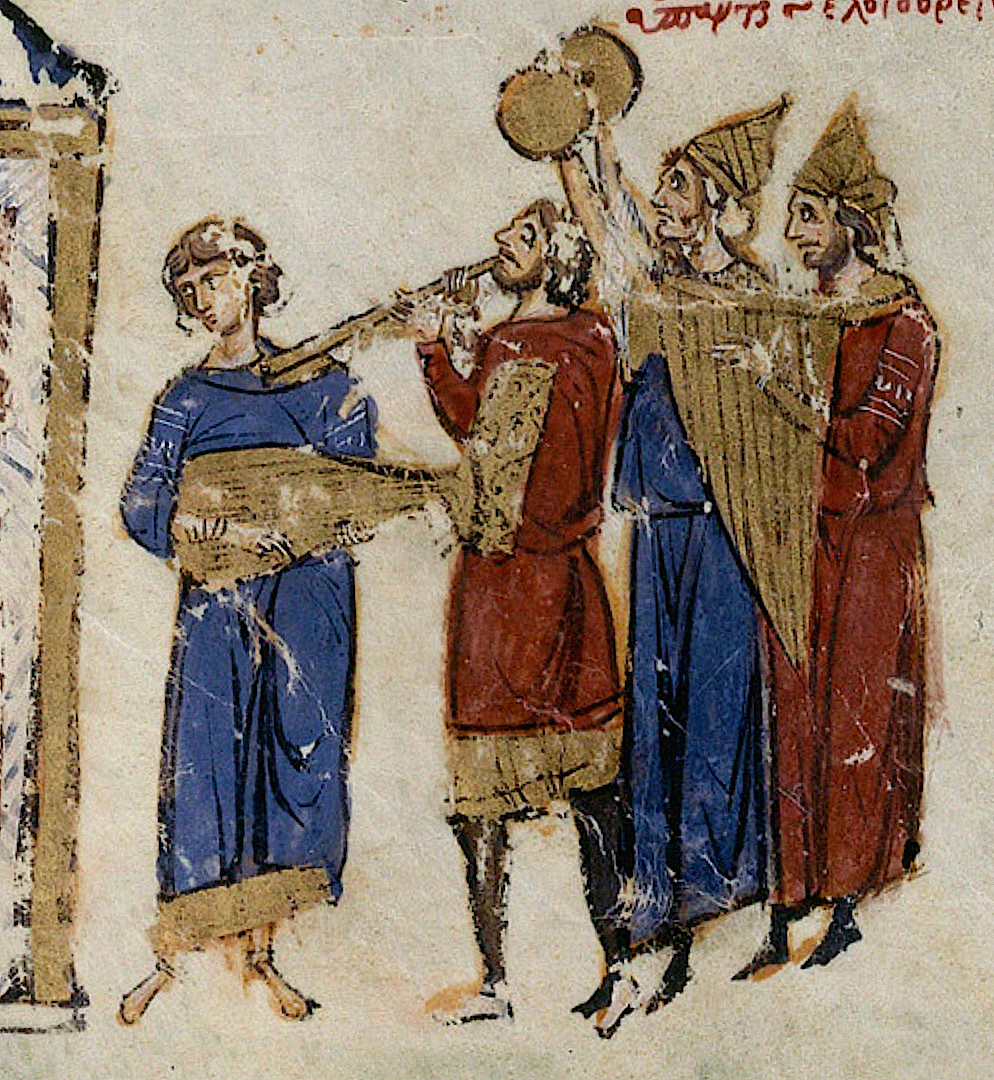
13th century, Palermo Sicily. Madrid Skylitzes (Cod. Vitr. 26-2, folio 78r)

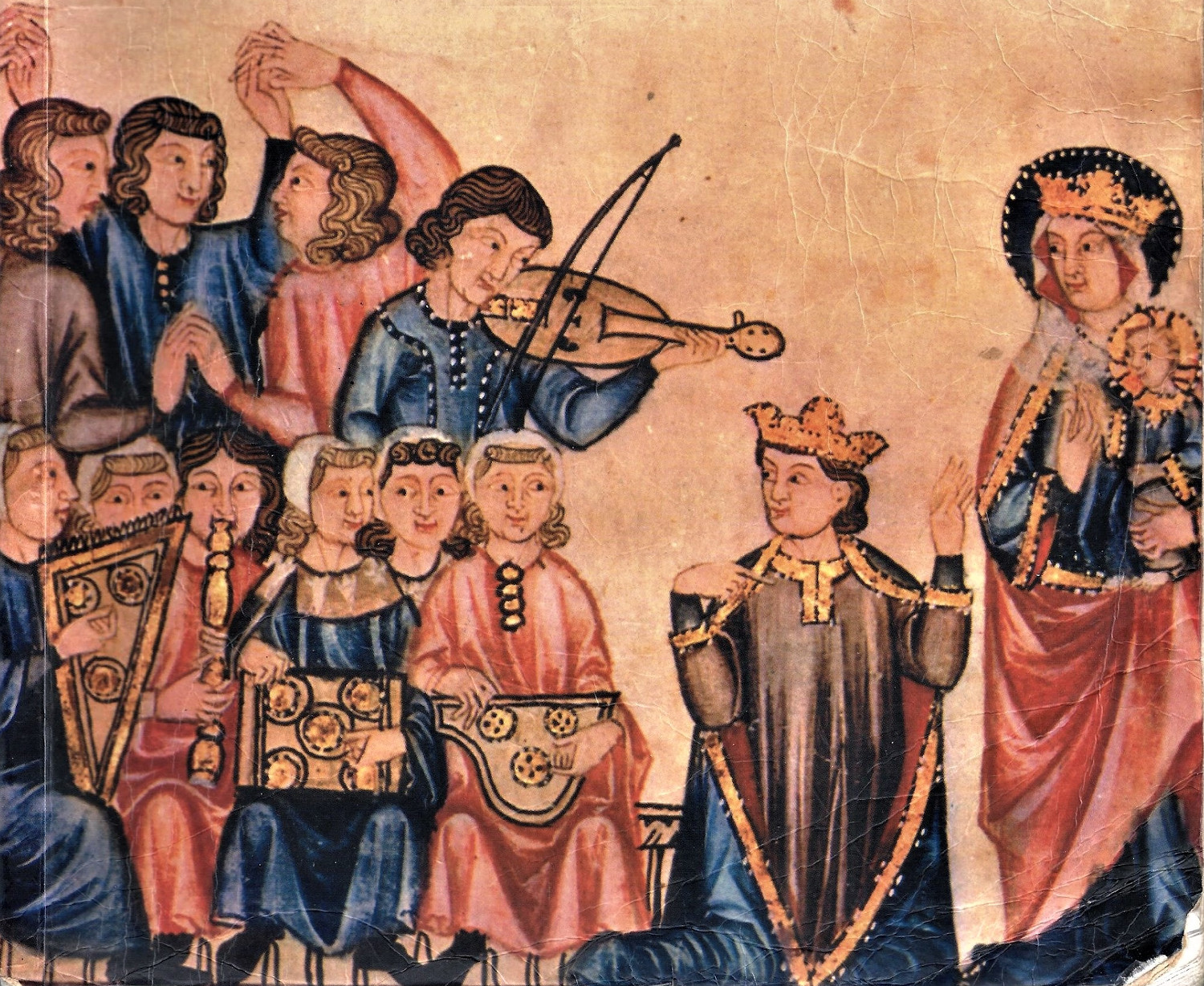
13th century, Spain, from the Codice Rico.

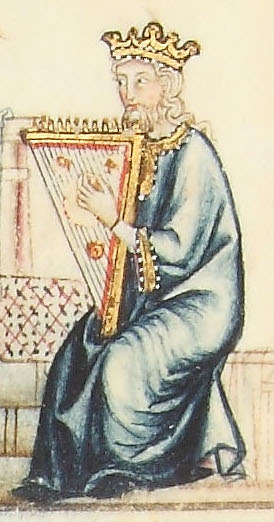
13th century, Spain, from the Codice Rico. A rotte with 15 strings visible.

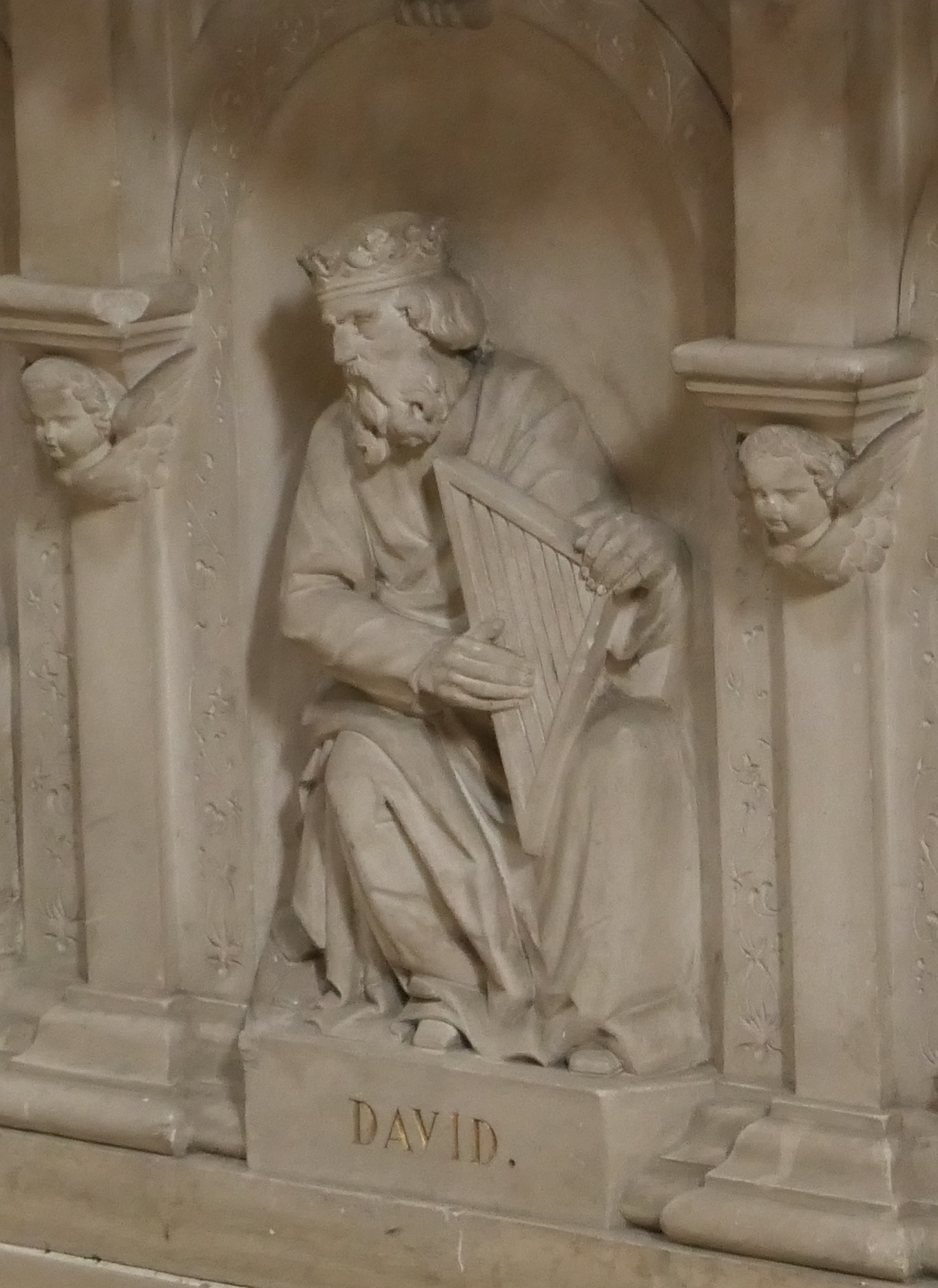
circa 14th century A.D., Saint-Florent-le-Vieil abby, Normandy. King David with Rotte

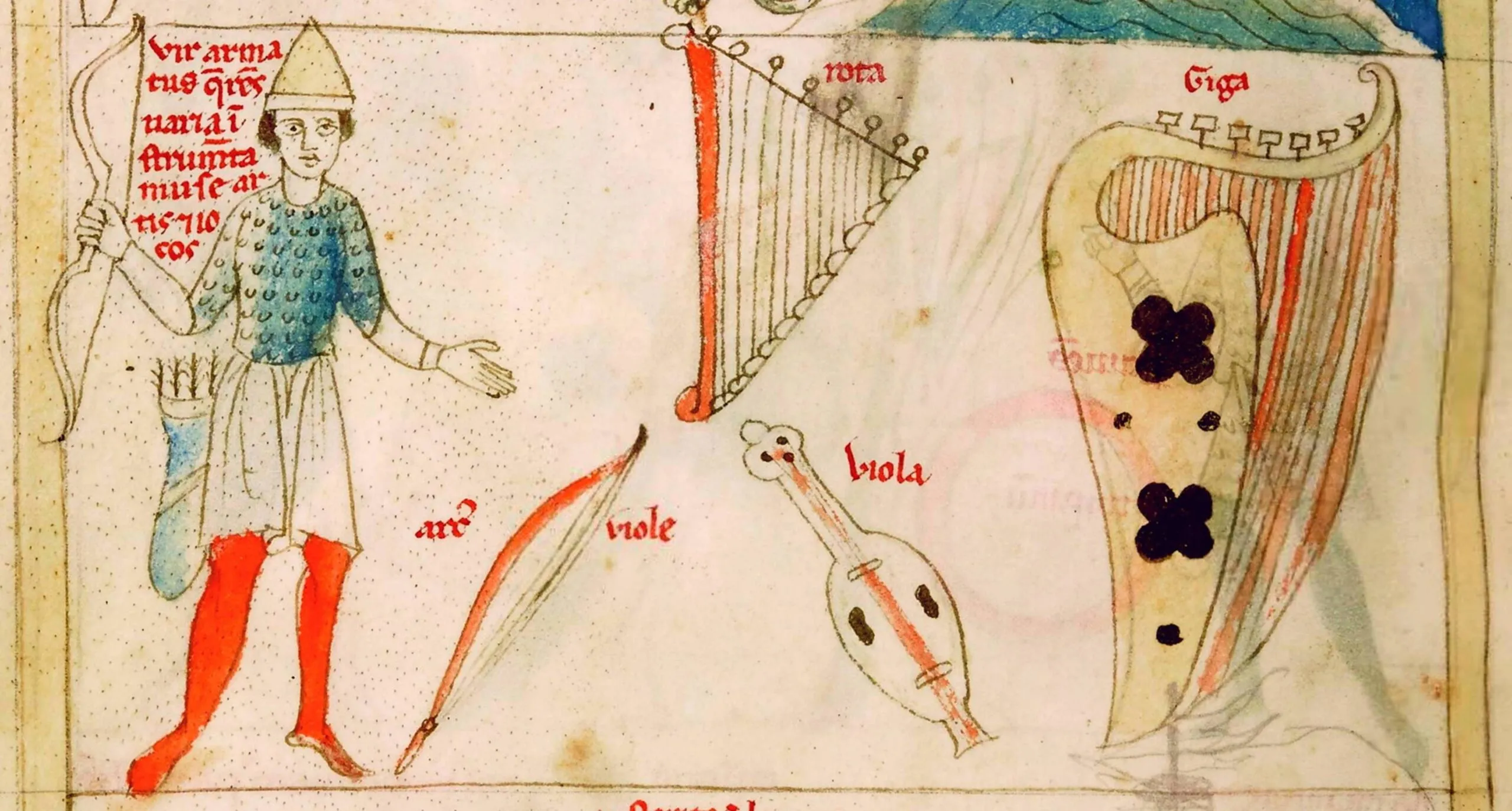
1301-1400, France. A rotte (rota), viola with bow and European harp, from view 16 of Liber astrologiae by Georgius Fendulus
