= Church of Saint Dominic, Soria =

Saint Dominic
- Santo Domingo (Spanish)
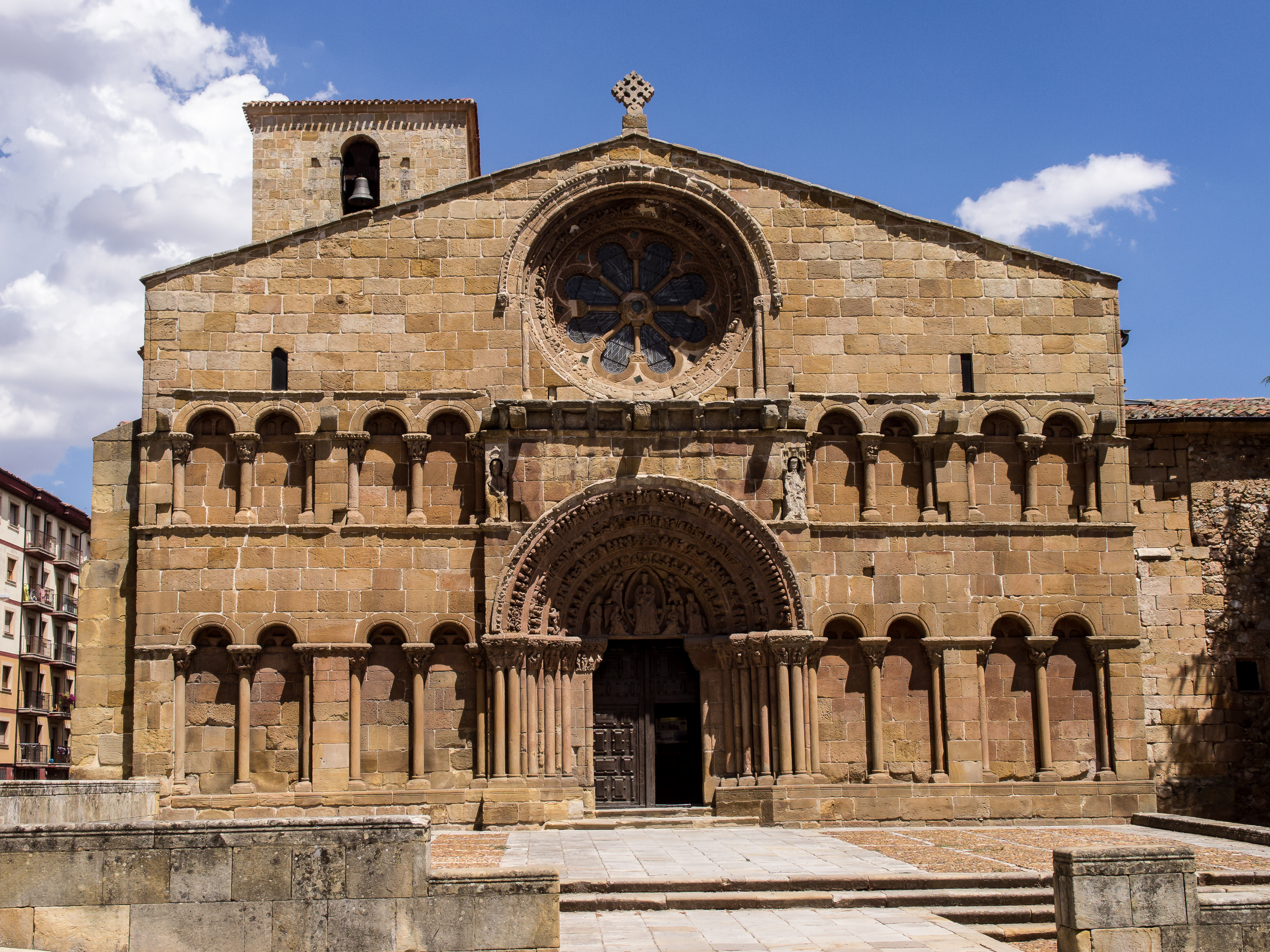

- Location within Spain
- 41.766599°N 2.466774°W
- Location: Soria, Spain

Spanish Cultural Heritage
- Official name: Iglesia de Santo Domingo
- Type: Non-movable
- Criteria: Monument
- Designated: 1929
- Reference no.: RI-51-0000337

Santo Domingo de Soria is a Romanesque-style, Roman Catholic church in Soria, Castile and León, Spain.

== History ==
It was built in the late 12th century above a pre-existing church dedicated to San Tomé, although it was partially renovated in the following centuries, including the century transept and choir area, added in the 16th century when a Dominican convent was founded annexed to the church.

It has a façade with two orders of arcades at the sides of the portal, which is surmounted by a rose window. The portal has an elaborated archivolt with Biblical characters and scenes, including the 24 Elders of the Apocalypse, the Massacre of the Innocents, the Youth, the Passion and the death of Christ. The tympanum has representations of the God the father sitting with the Child, four angels with the symbols of the Evangelists, the prophet Isaiah and the Virgin Mary. The capitals on the jambs of the entry feature biblical scenes from the Genesis and the life of Christ.

The interior is on the Latin cross plan with a nave and two aisles, covered by barrel vaults.

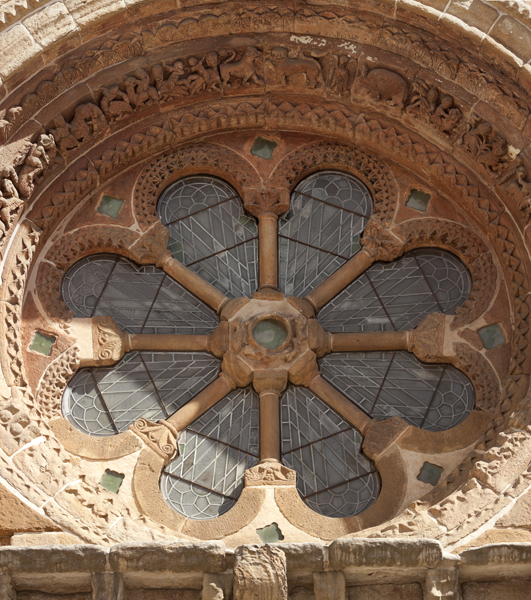
Rose window

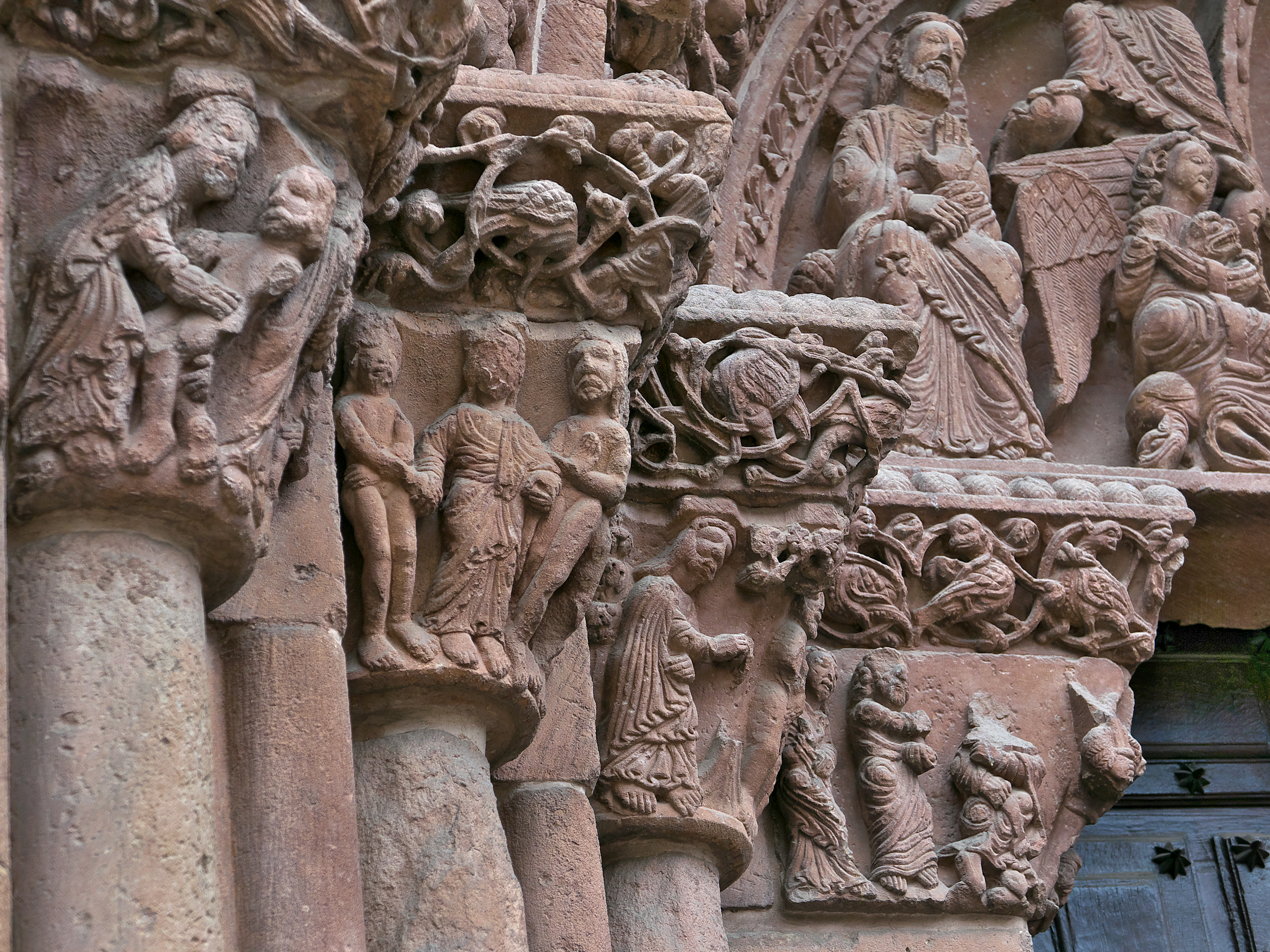
Capitals

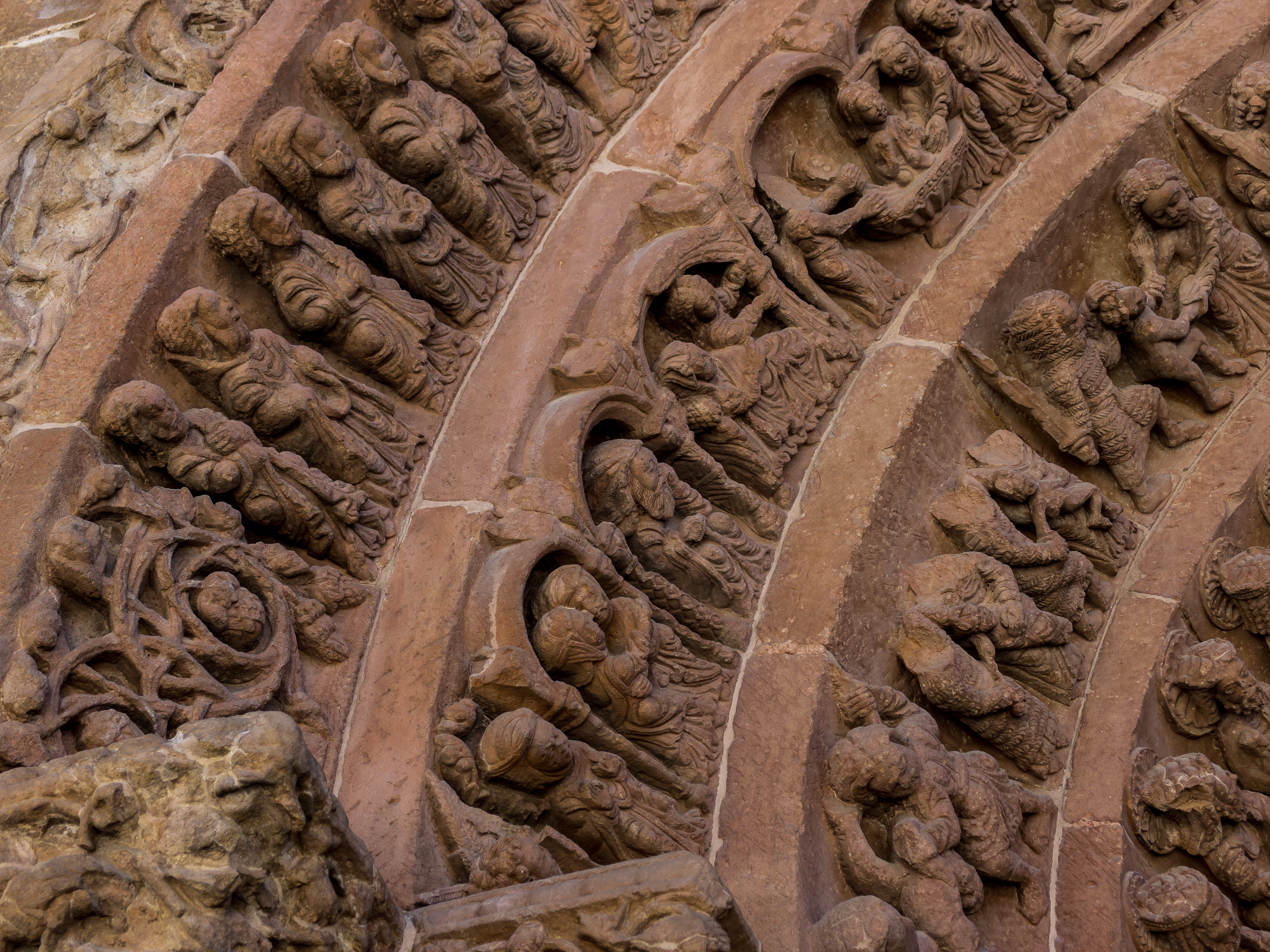
Archivolt

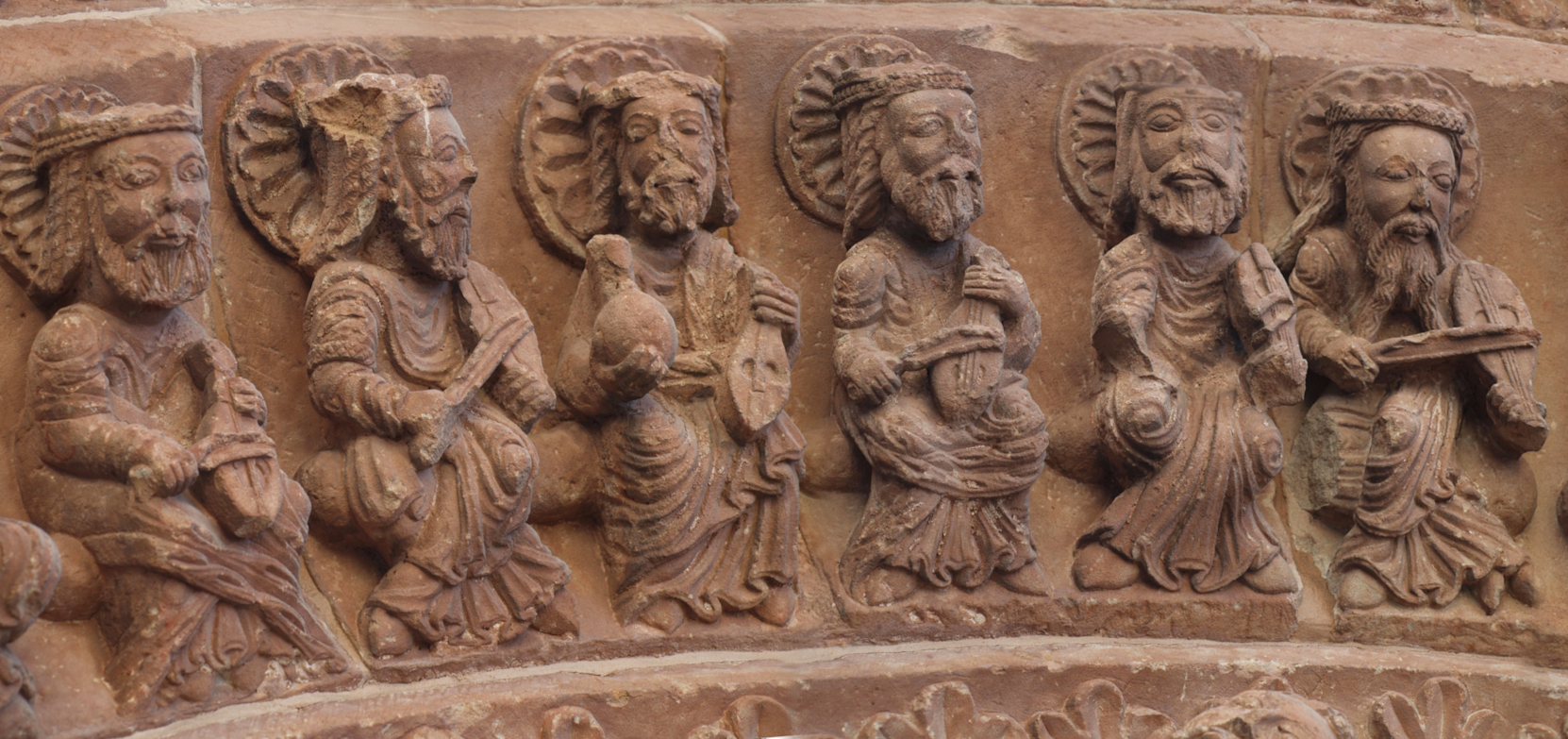
Some of the 24 Elders of the Apocalypse with rebecs or rabels.

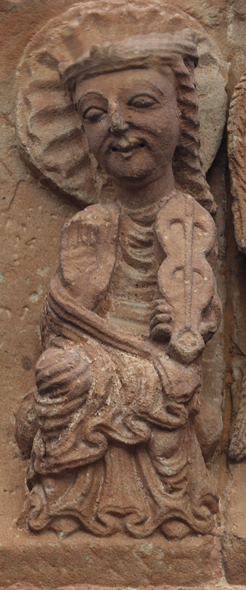
One of the 24 Elders of the Apocalypse with a plucked rabel.

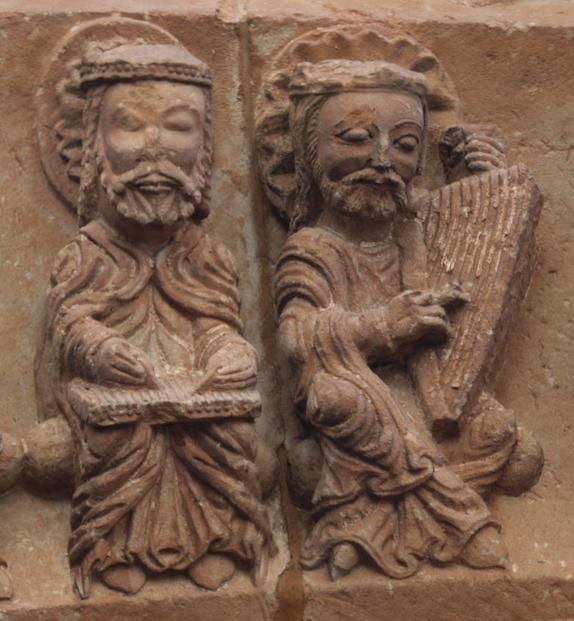
Two of the 24 Elders of the Apocalypse with a psaltery and rota.

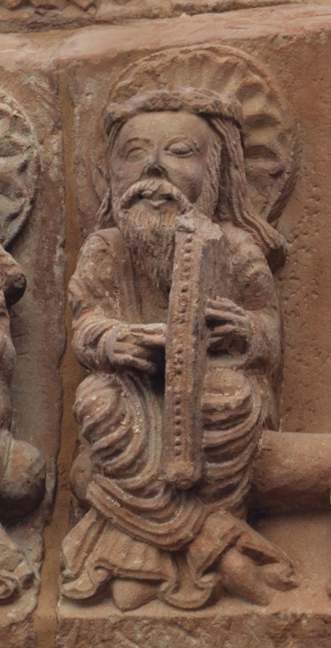
An Elders of the Apocalypse with a rota.

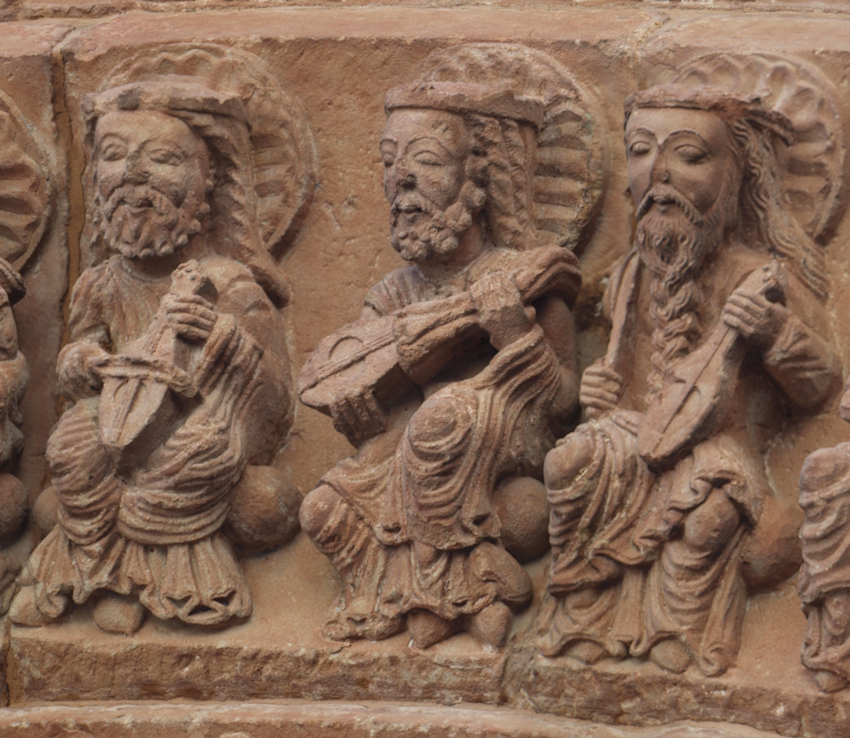
Elders of the Apocalypse with rebecs or rabels.

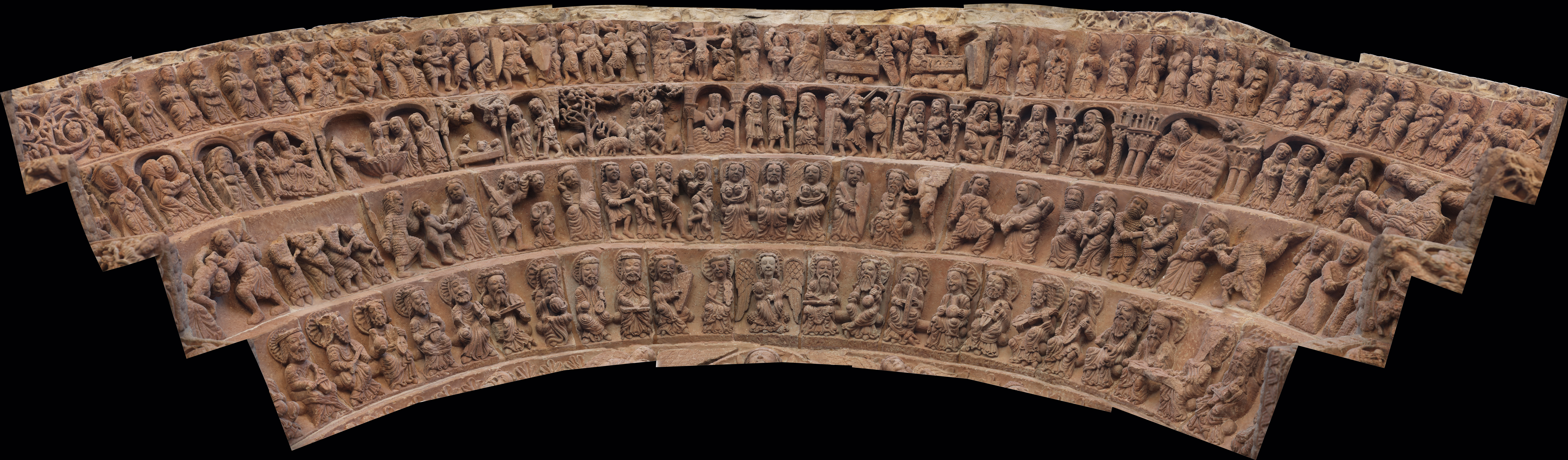
Photographic development of archivolts of Saint Dominic of Soria
