= Nigg Stone =

Pictish symbol stone in Nigg Old Parish Church, Nigg, Highland, Scotland

Coordinates: 57°43′10″N 4°0′31″W

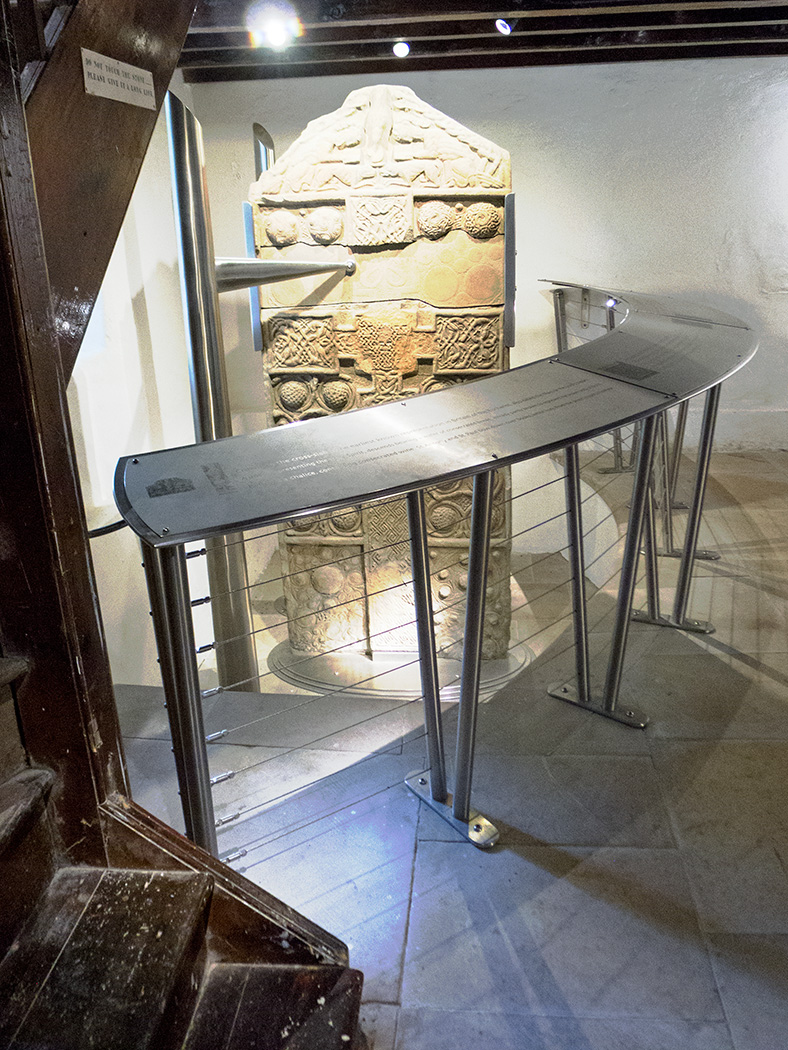
Nigg Stone, inside the church

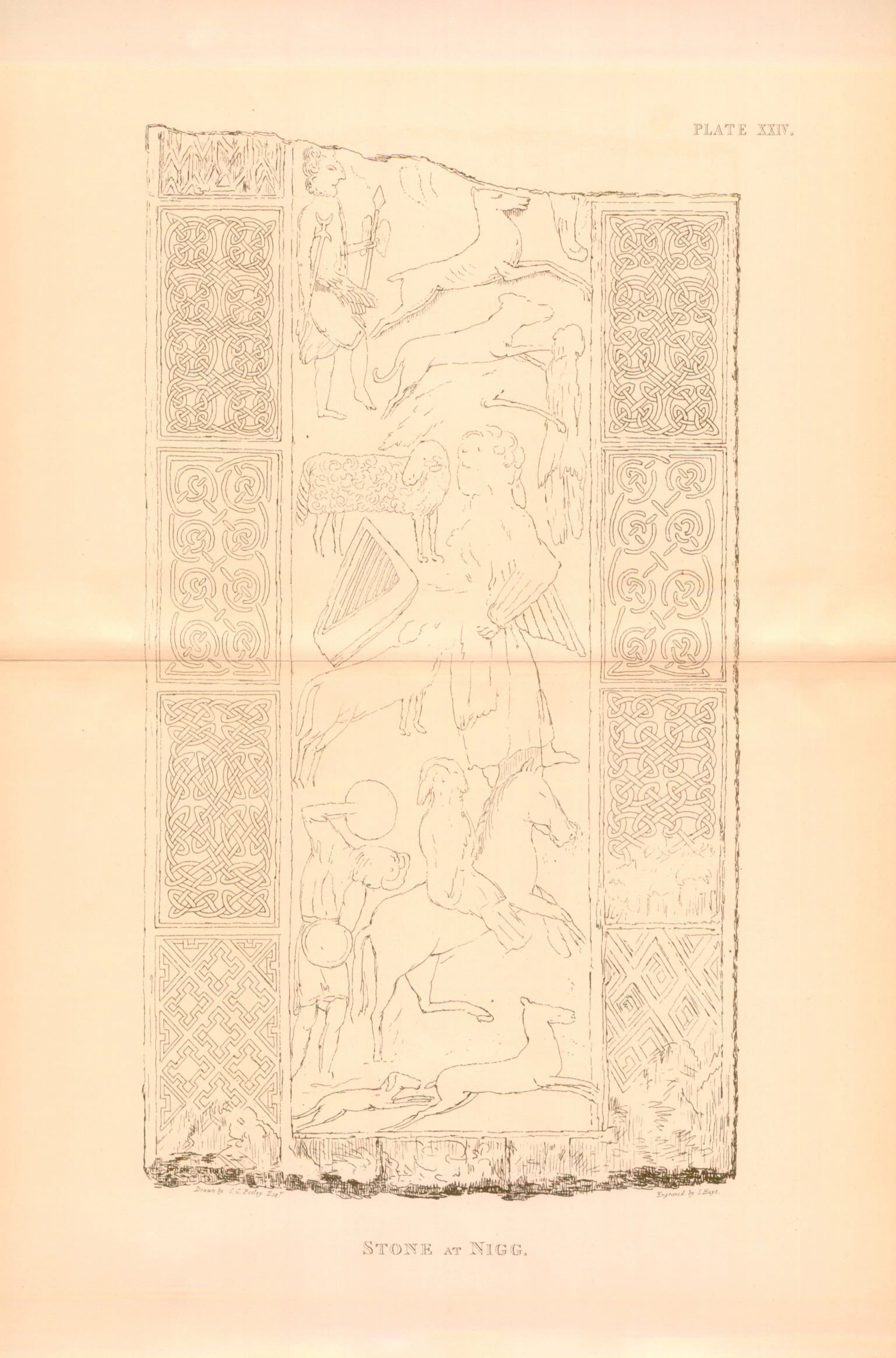
The reverse or "secular" side of the stone in a 19th-century illustration, minus the top section.

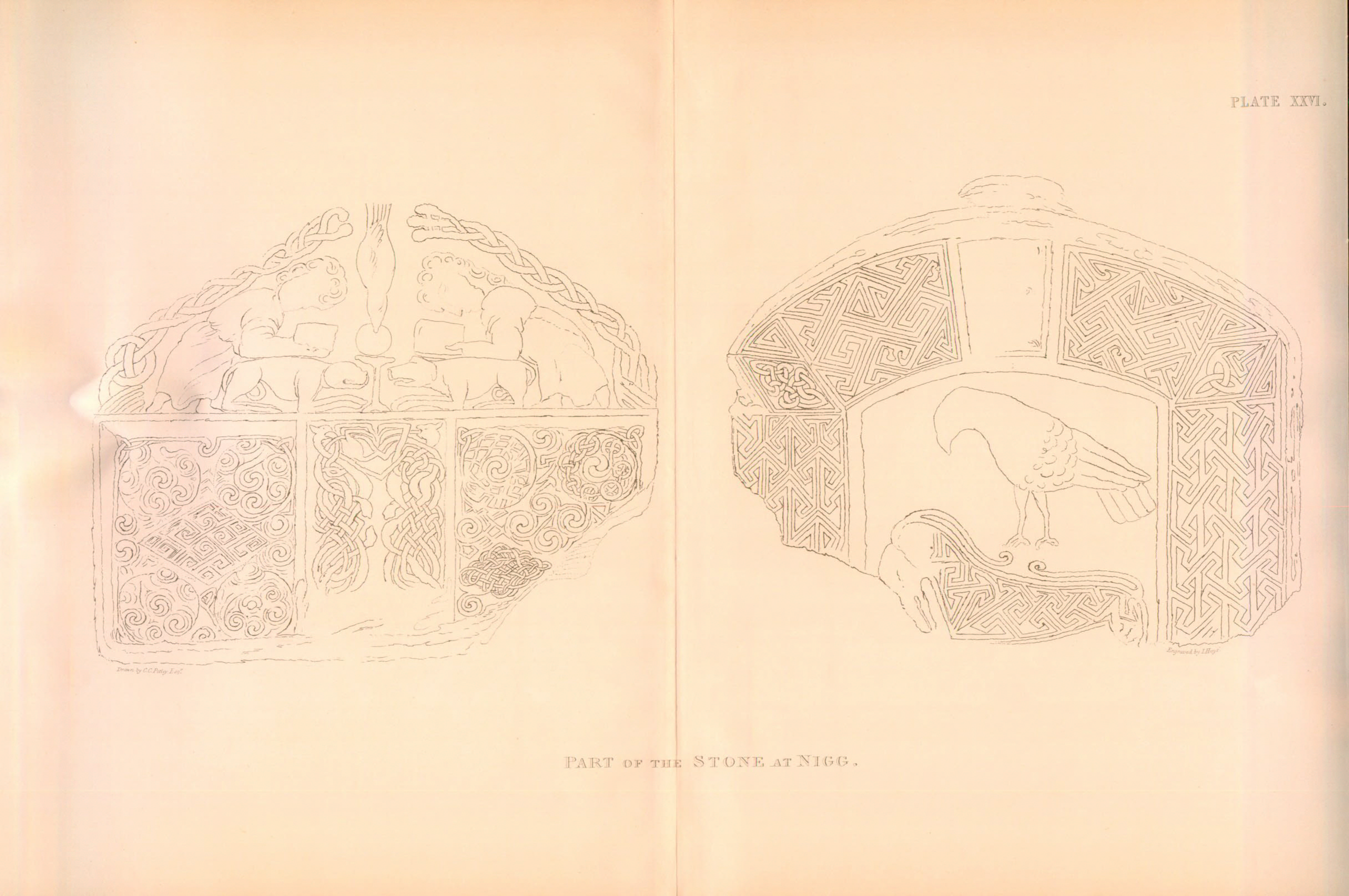
Top most fragment, showing depictions on both the front and reverse of the stone.

The Nigg Stone is an incomplete Class II Pictish cross-slab, perhaps dating to the end of the 8th century.

The stone was originally located at the gateway to the grounds of the parish church of Nigg, Easter Ross, Scotland. It is one of the finest surviving Pictish carved stones, and one of the most elaborate carved stones surviving from early medieval Europe. It is now displayed, restored to its original proportions, in a room inside the parish church (open in summer; key kept locally). It bears an elaborately decorated cross in high relief on the 'front' and a figural scene on the reverse. This scene is extremely complicated and made more difficult to interpret by deliberate defacement. Among the depictions are two Pictish symbols: an eagle above a Pictish Beast, a sheep, the oldest evidence of a European triangular harp, and hunting scenes. Scholars interpret the scene as representing a story of the biblical King David. The carvings on the cross side show close similarities to the contemporary high crosses of Iona. These works may indeed have been made by the same 'school' of carvers, working for different patrons.

The stone was shattered in the 18th century. The upper and lower parts were crudely joined together using metal staples (now removed), and the shattered intervening part was discarded. Part of the missing fragment was recovered in 1998 by Niall M Robertson, in the stream which runs below the mound on which the churchyard is set, having probably been thrown down the bank at the time the slab was 'repaired'. This small fragment shows most of the 'Pictish beast' symbol, and was preserved in Tain Museum, until being reattached during a restoration in 2013.

It is a scheduled monument.
