= Tomoko Sugawara =

Japanese harpist

- Origin: Tokyo, Japan
- Genres: World music; Classical music
- Occupations: musician, harpist
- Instruments: kugo concert harp
- Years active: 1991–present
- Label: Motéma Music
- Website: kugoharp.com

Tomoko Sugawara is a harpist from Tokyo, Japan. Sugawara plays the kugo or angular harp as well as the classical and Irish harp. She worked with American harp builder Bill Campbell to construct a fully working model of a kugo. She has collaborated with multiple artists, released albums and taught kugo.

== Biography ==
Sugawara began playing Irish harp at age 12, then moved to the concert harp at age 16. She graduated from Tokyo University of the Arts with the concert harp as her main instrument.

In 1991, Sugawara began playing the kugo. With Swedish professor Bo Lawergren, whom she met at a kugo museum exhibit in Nara, Japan, she engineered a fully working model of a kugo and hired American harp builder Bill Campbell to construct it. After adjusting to the soft sound of the model, she recorded a CD on Motéma Music called Along the Silk Road, released in 2010, which was a nominee for the Independent Music Awards in the Traditional/World category. She worked with flutist Robert Dick and bendir and darabukka player Ozan Aksöy for pieces composed by Kikuko Masumoto, Stephen Dydo (based on music from the Tang dynasty), Qutb al-Din al-Shirazi (1236–1311, Iran), Robert Lombardo, Amir Mahyar Tafreshipour, and Sugawara's own arrangements of works by Alfonso X.

She has performed recitals of both concert harp and kugo at the World Harp Congress (in Prague and Amsterdam), Indiana University, Columbia University, Harvard University, University of Pennsylvania, Princeton University, and The British Museum.
