= Konghou =

Ancient Chinese harp

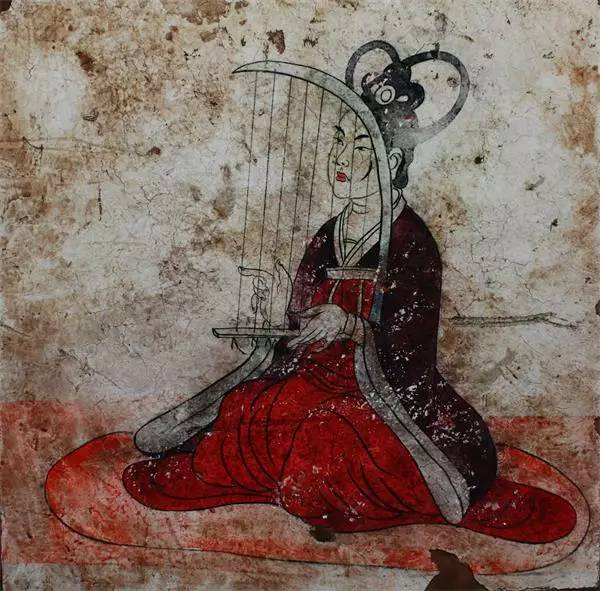
- Konghou, tomb of Wei Guifei (AD 597–665)

String instrument
- Classification: chordophone

Related instruments
- Çeng; Chang (instrument); harp; angular harp

The konghou (Chinese: 箜篌; pinyin: kōnghóu) is a Chinese plucked string instrument. In ancient China, the term konghou came to refer to three different musical instruments: a zither and two different types of harp.

Today, konghou usually refers the modern konghou concert harp, which was invented in the last century. Shu-konghou refers to an extinct vertical angular harp, and feng shou konghou to an extinct arched harp.

During the Tang dynasty it was also used as a general term for string instruments from other countries that played in the Chinese court. It may not have meant a specific type of instrument at that time. In the Song dynasty, because the konghou was increasingly associated with lower-status courtesans and singing girls, its music was considered licentious and dangerous, earning it the nickname "the Marquis (hou) of the Empty (kong) State" (kongguo zhi hou 空國之候).

== History ==
There were three types of variations of the konghou name, and scholars have been working to match them to musical instruments. The variations are wo konghou, shu konghou and feng shou konghou.

=== Wo konghou ===
Variations of wo konghou

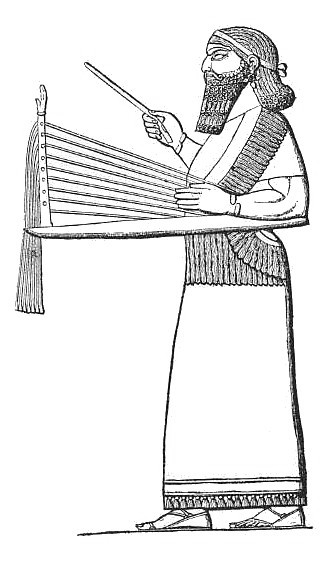
Assyrian horizontal harp

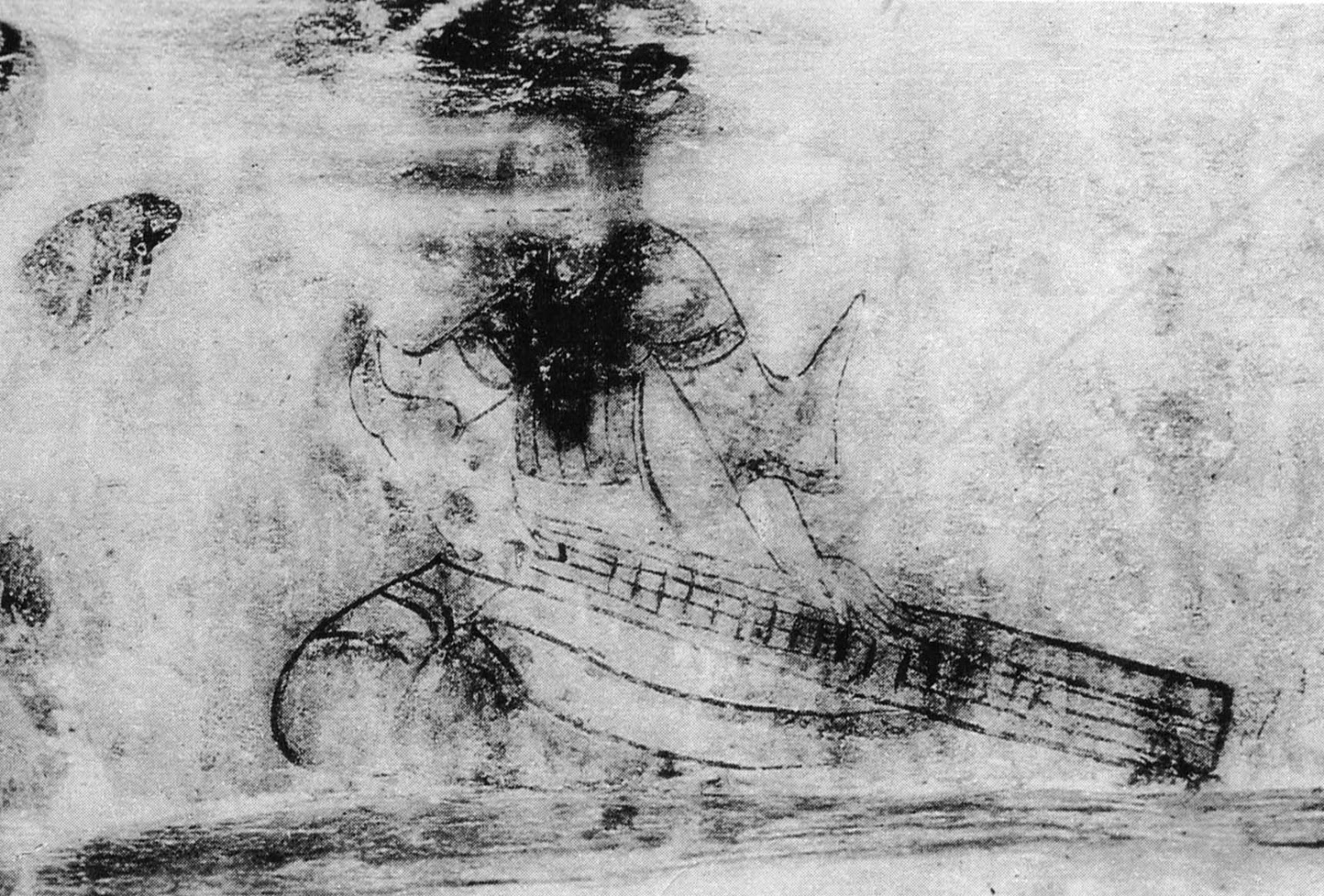
A musician playing a wo konghou. Excavated from a tomb near Ji'an (集安市), Tonghua (通化市), southern Jilin province, northeast China. Goguryeo period (고구려 / 高句麗), 37 BC – 668 AD.

With the wo-konghou (卧箜篌; 'horizontal konghou'), there have been two lines of thought; neither has been proven. One use of wo konghou could have been applied to a fretted bridge zither whose strings were plucked with a slender bamboo stick). The other possibility for the wo-konghou is as an angular harp turned on its side to function as a horizontal harp.

==== Zither ====
The zither form was first mentioned in written texts in the Spring and Autumn period (770–476 BC). It is one of the oldest Chinese musical instruments, similar to the Korean geomungo. The wo-konghou was used to play yayue (court music) in the Kingdom of Chu. During the Han dynasty (206 BC – 220 AD) the konghou was used in the qingshangyue genre. This instrument seems to have been no longer used, but recently China has been reviving the wo-konghou and bringing it into the traditional orchestra.

==== Horizontal harp ====
In 1996, horizontal angular harps from the 5th century BC were found in Zagunluq village, Qiemo county, Xinjiang autonomous region, China. The harps bear close resemblance to harps from Pazyryk, Assyria and Olbia. Archeological finds show details of construction; for instance, the soundboxes were carved from diversiform-leaved poplar. The finds are evidence of contact between Xinjiang and Altai, Assyria and the Black Sea region. The finds show a pre-Han dynasty konghou, that may date as far back as 1000 BC: that date is speculative and needs more evidence.

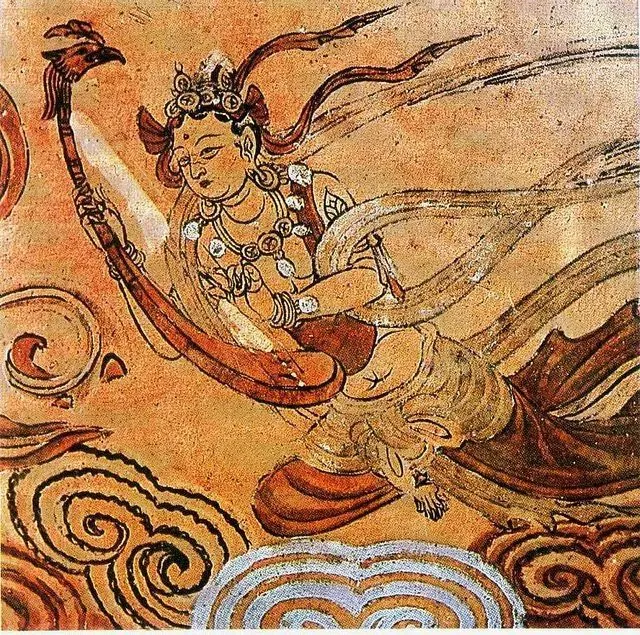
Feng shou konghou or phoenix headed konghou harp, Western Xia (1036–1226 AD) Vertical arched-harp

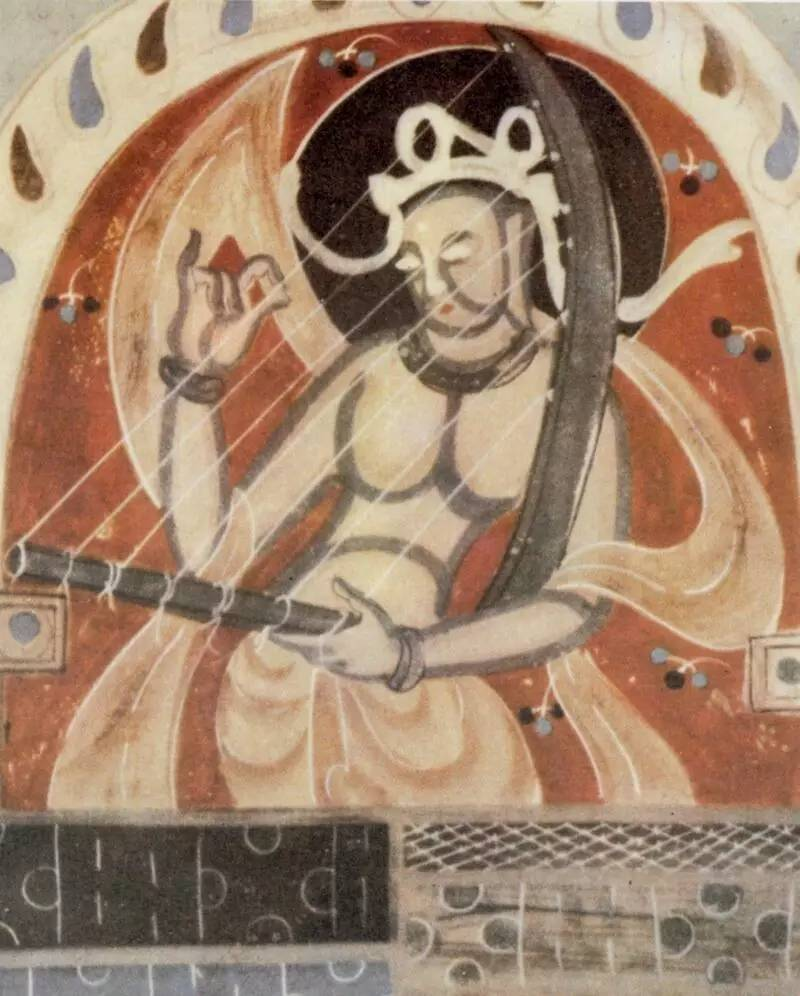
Shu-konghou, Northern Wei dynasty, 386–535. Vertical angular-harp

=== Shu konghou ===
The shu-konghou or vertical konghou first appeared in the Eastern Han dynasty (25–220 AD). It can be divided into big and small varieties. The playing of the shu-konghou was most prevalent in the Sui and Tang dynasties. It was generally played in rites and ceremonies and gradually increased in popularity among the ordinary people. It is also the most common type of konghou in Chinese cultural relics, murals and poetry. The Chinese harp refers to this kind of konghou.

=== Feng shou konghou ===
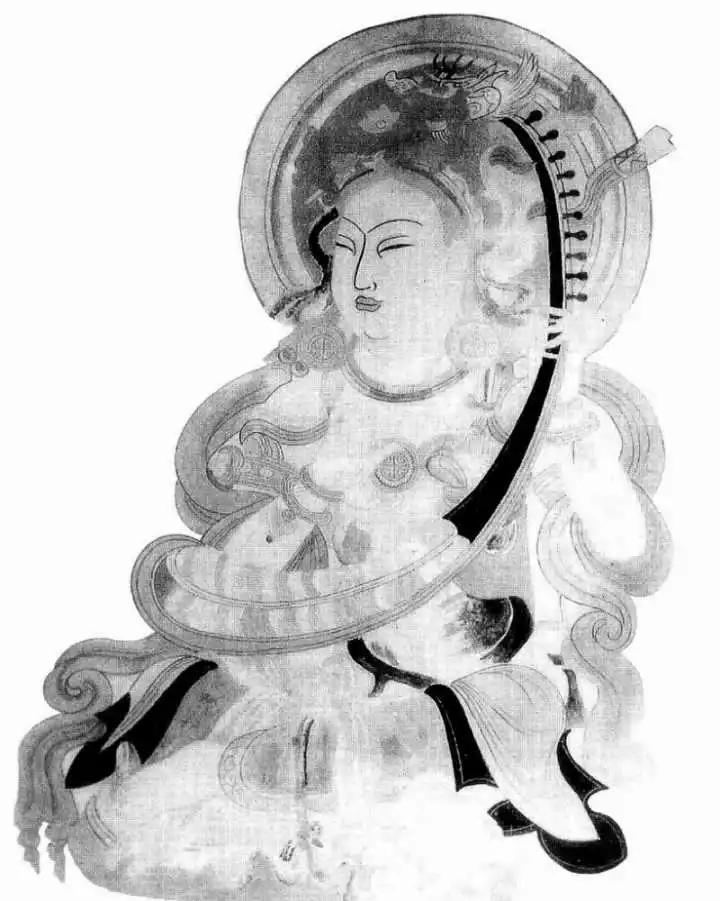
Phoenix headed konghou (Konghou fengshou), 10th century AD, Bezeklik Caves, cave 48

The feng shou konghou (鳳首箜篌; 'phoenix-headed konghou'), an arched harp, was introduced from India in the Eastern Jin dynasty (317–420 AD). Beginning in the Sui dynasty (581–618), it was also used in yanyue (banquet music). The instrument became extinct sometime in the Ming dynasty.

== Modern konghou ==
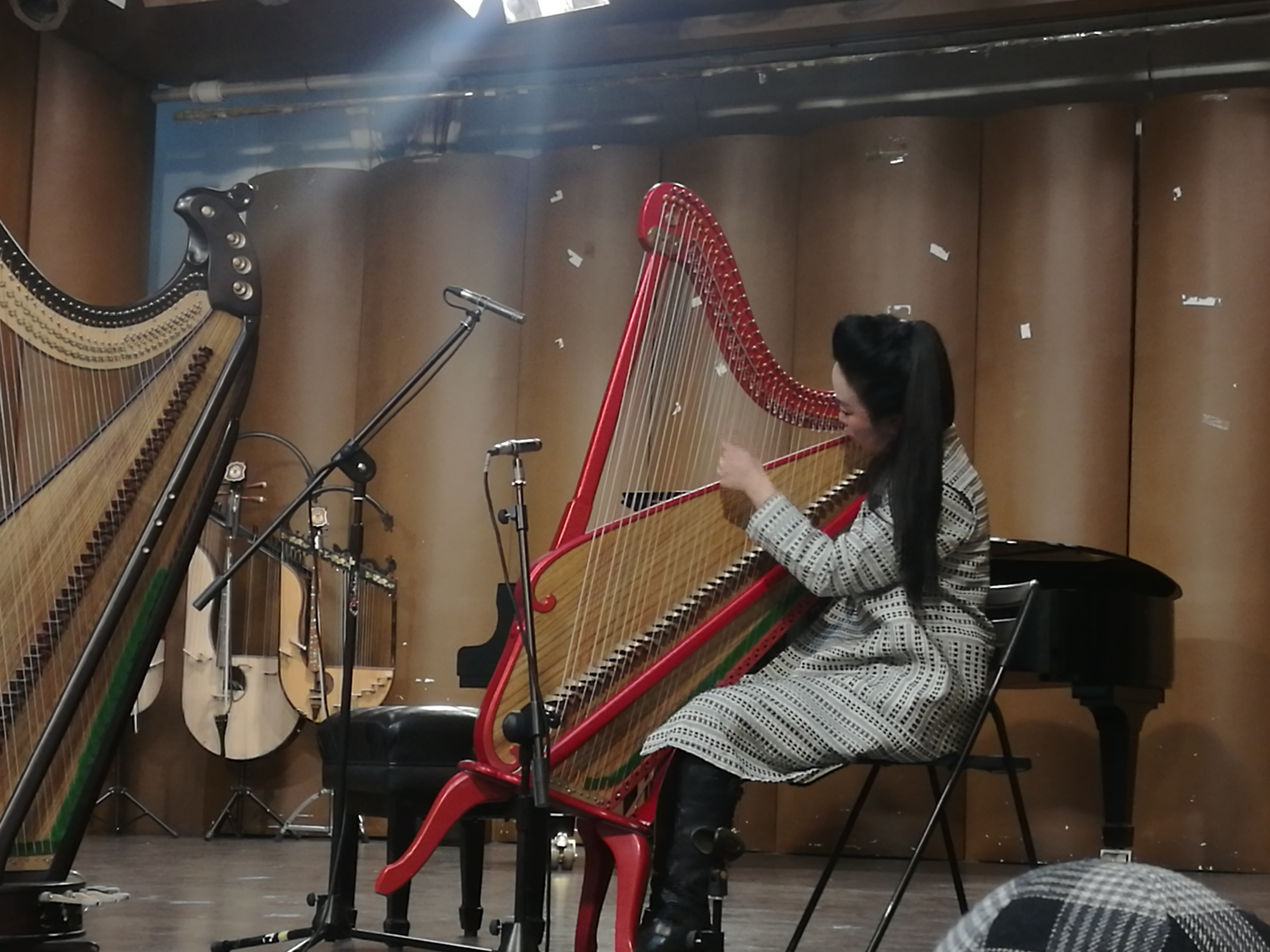
Modern Western-influenced concert konghou, 2017

The modern konghou appeared in the 20th century and is different from the ancient konghou. Its shape is similar to Western concert harps.

Modern concert konghous may be contrasted from the Western concert harps by looking at the strings, which are folded over on the konghou to make two rows. This allows players the use of "advanced playing techniques", including vibrato, bending tones and overtones. Paired strings on opposite sides of the instrument are tuned to the same note. They start from a tuning peg and travel over two bridges on opposite sides of the instrument, down through the playing area and are then fixed at the far end to opposite sides of a freely moving lever. Depressing the lever changes the pitch in one of the strings in the pair, raising the pitch of the other. The two rows of strings also make it easier to play swift rhythms.

Today, the classical konghou is usually referred to as shu-konghou to differentiate it from the modern konghou.

== In other places ==
=== Korea ===
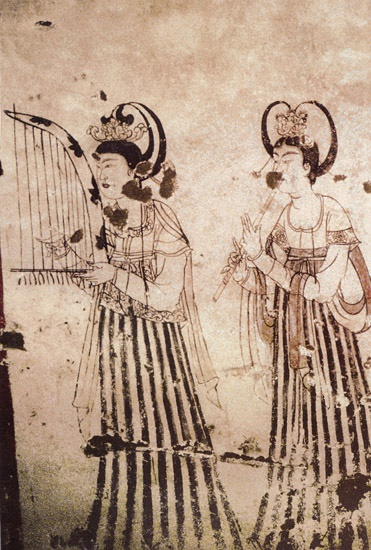
Art from tomb of Princess Yan. A small harp that could have been labeled sogonghu in Korea.

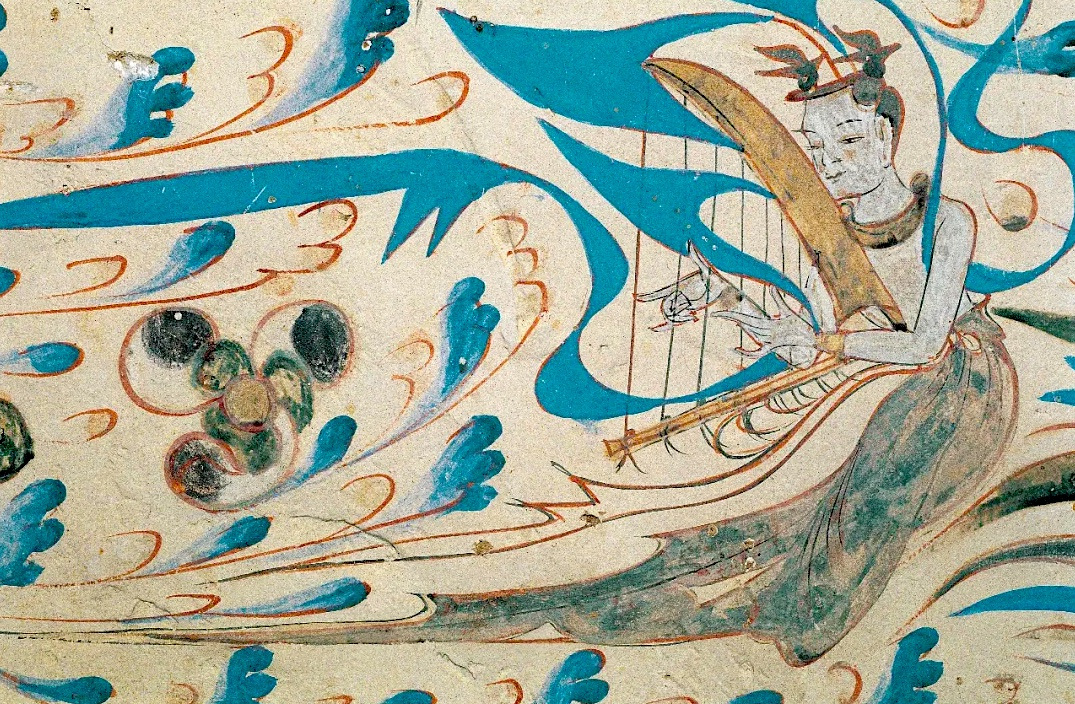
Vertical konghou, Wei dynasty, from Mogao Caves circa 535 to 557 AD. Koreans called this sugonghu.

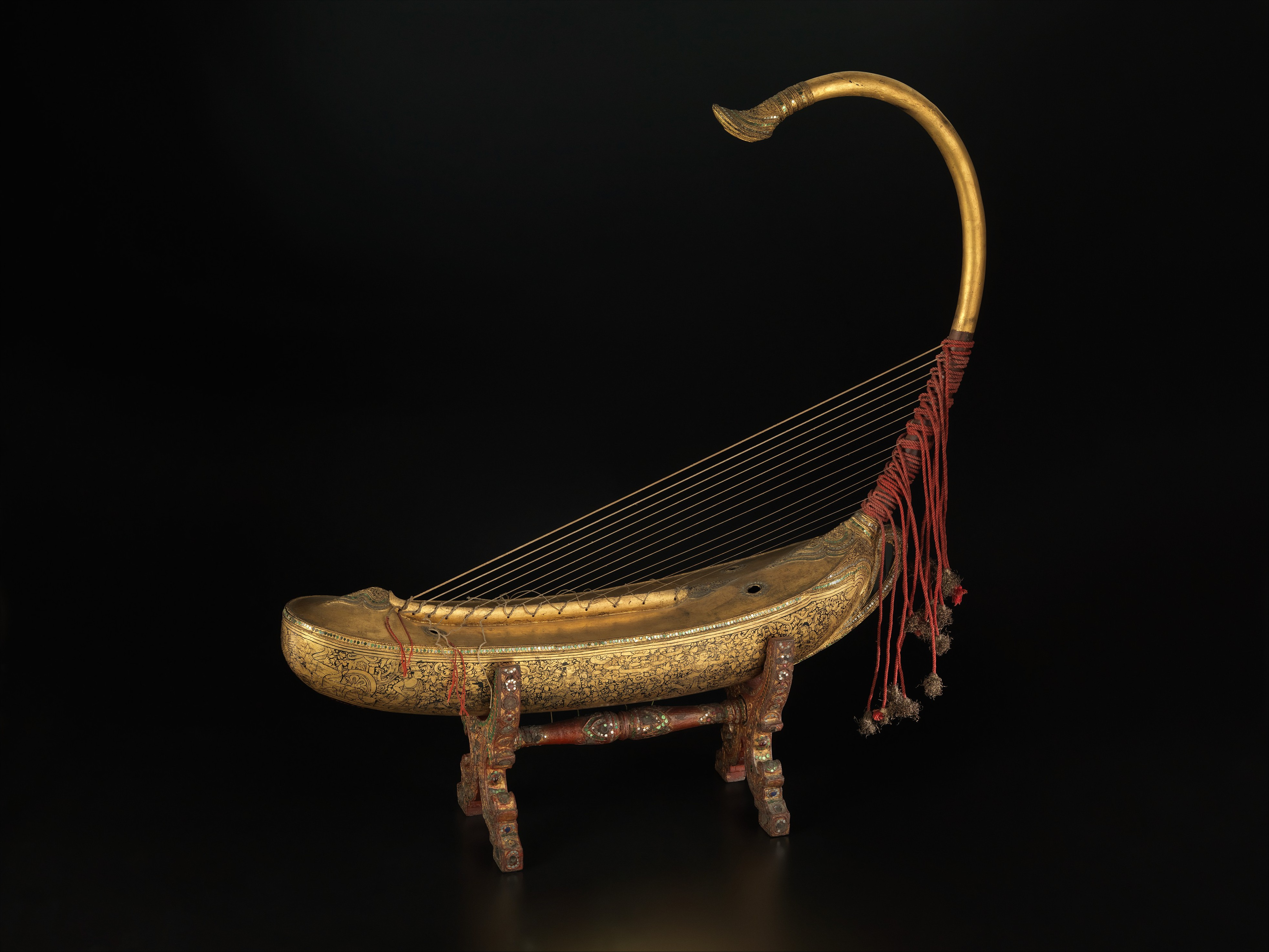
Burmese Saung gauk. The Korean name for this type of arched harp was wagonhu.

In Korea, like China, the names for the harps started as terms for nonspecific foreign stringed instruments. The konghou was adopted in Korea, where it was called gonghu (hangul: 공후; hanja: 箜篌), but its use died out (although it has been revived by some South Korean musicians in the early 21st century). There were three subtypes according to shape:

- Sogonghu (hangul: 소공후; hanja: 小箜篌; literally "small harp")^{photo} The sogonhu was a vertical angular harp, one small enough to be carried in the musicians hands while playing.
- Sugonghu (hangul: 수공후; hanja: 豎箜篌; literally "vertical harp")^{photo} This is the same harp as the shu konghou and looks like vertical harps from ancient Assyria.
- Wagonghu (hangul: 와공후; hanja: 臥箜篌; literally "lying down harp") The wagonhu today is designated for arched harps that have the appearance of the arched harp from Myanmar, the saung.

=== Japan ===
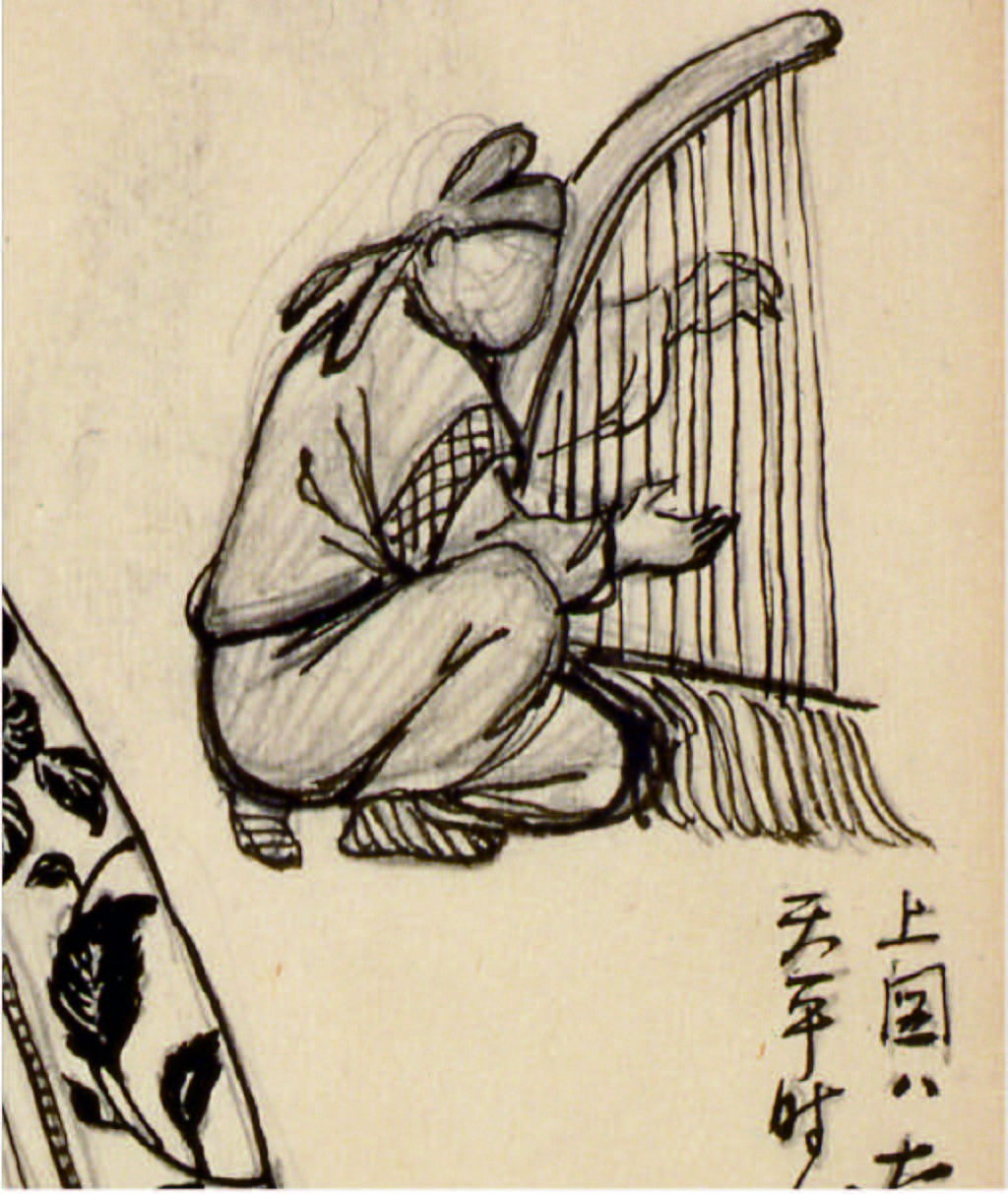
Japanese kugo, angular harp. 19th century drawing.

In Japan, the wo-konghou (fretted zither) was called kudaragoto (百済琴 / くだらごと), and the shu-konghou (angular harp) was called kugo (箜篌 / くご). These instruments were in use in some Togaku (Tang music) performances during the Nara period, but seem to have died out by the 10th century. The kugo (angular harp) has been revived in Japan since the late 20th century, and the Japanese composer Mamoru Fujieda has composed for it. Tomoko Sugawara commissioned a playable kugo harp from builder Bill Campbell and earned an Independent Music Awards nomination for her 2010 album, Along the Silk Road, playing traditional and newly written works for the instrument.

== Gallery ==
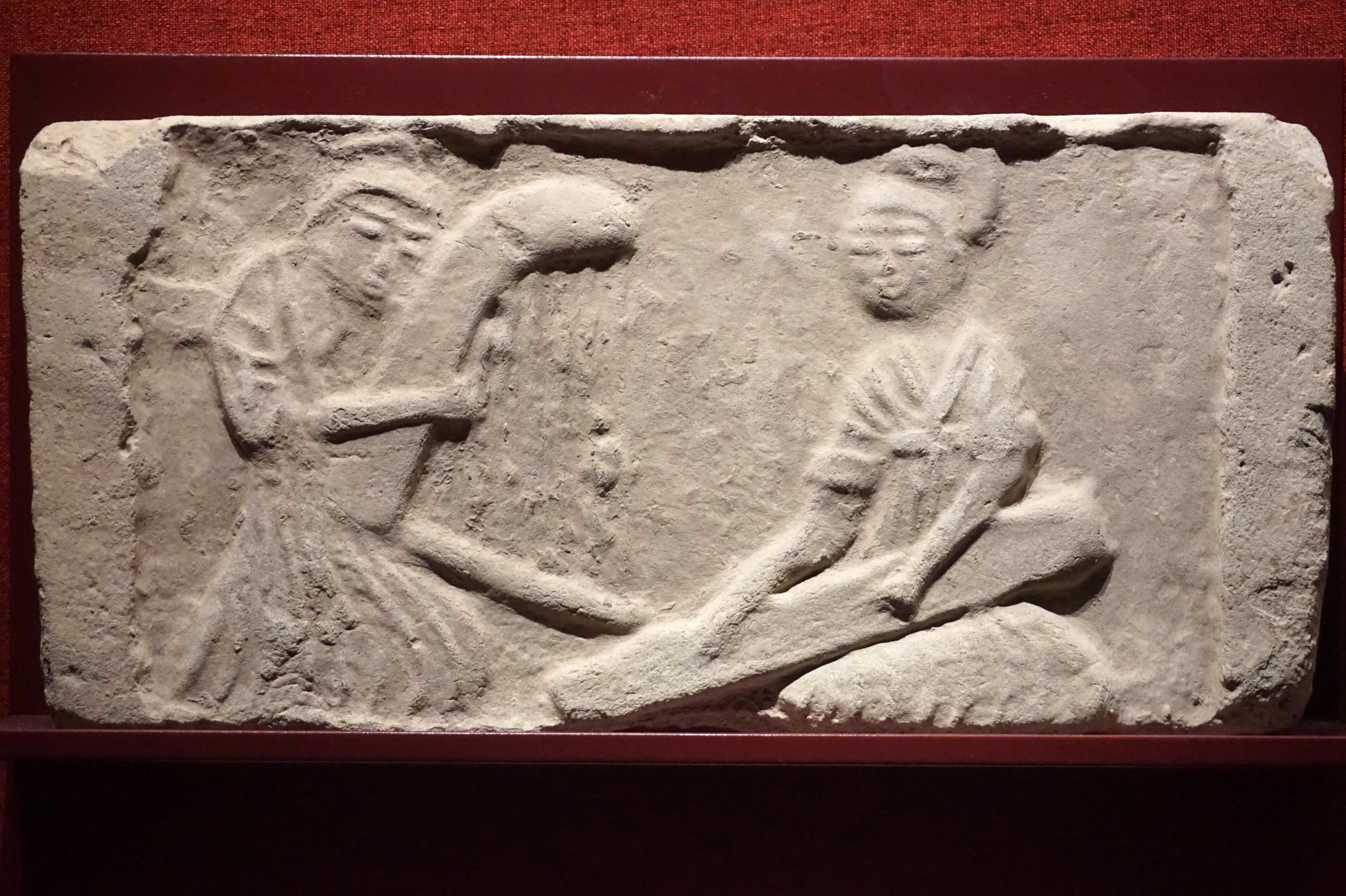
Konghou (left) and guqin, Tang dynasty (618–907), unearthed in Jiuquan. Museum of Gansu Province.

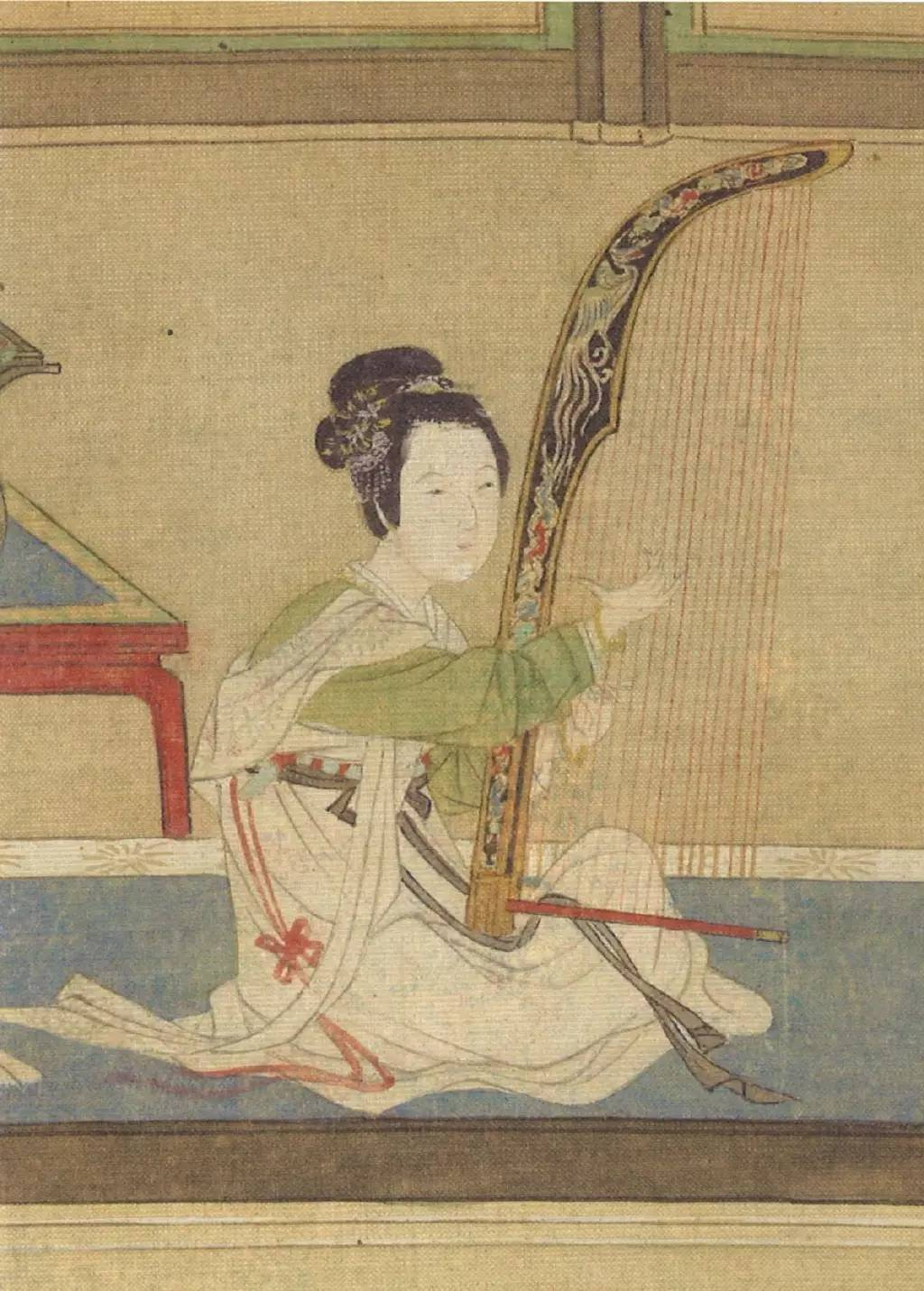
Konghou from silk painting by Qiu Ying (1494–1552), "Spring Morning in the Han Palace"

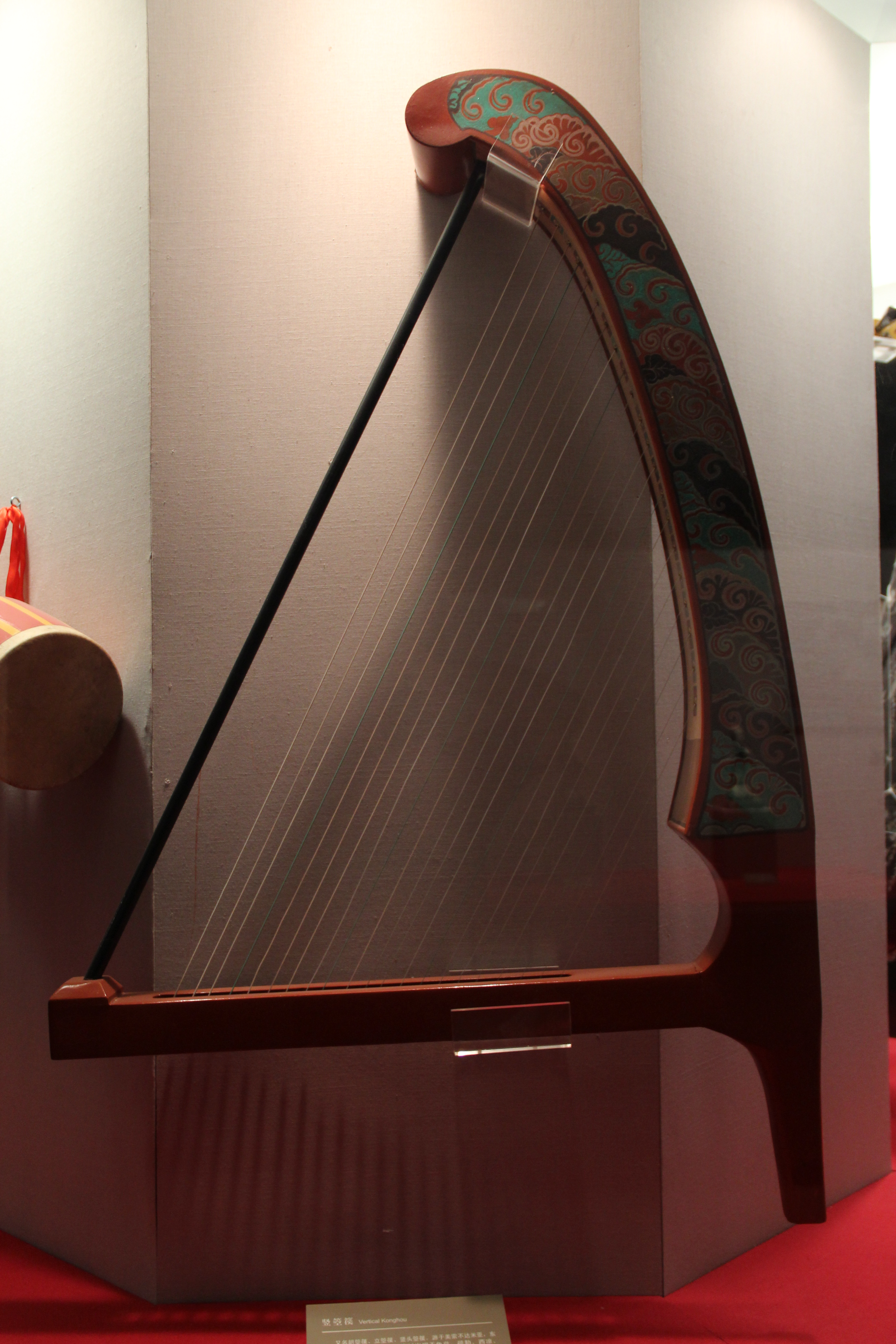
Vertical konghou

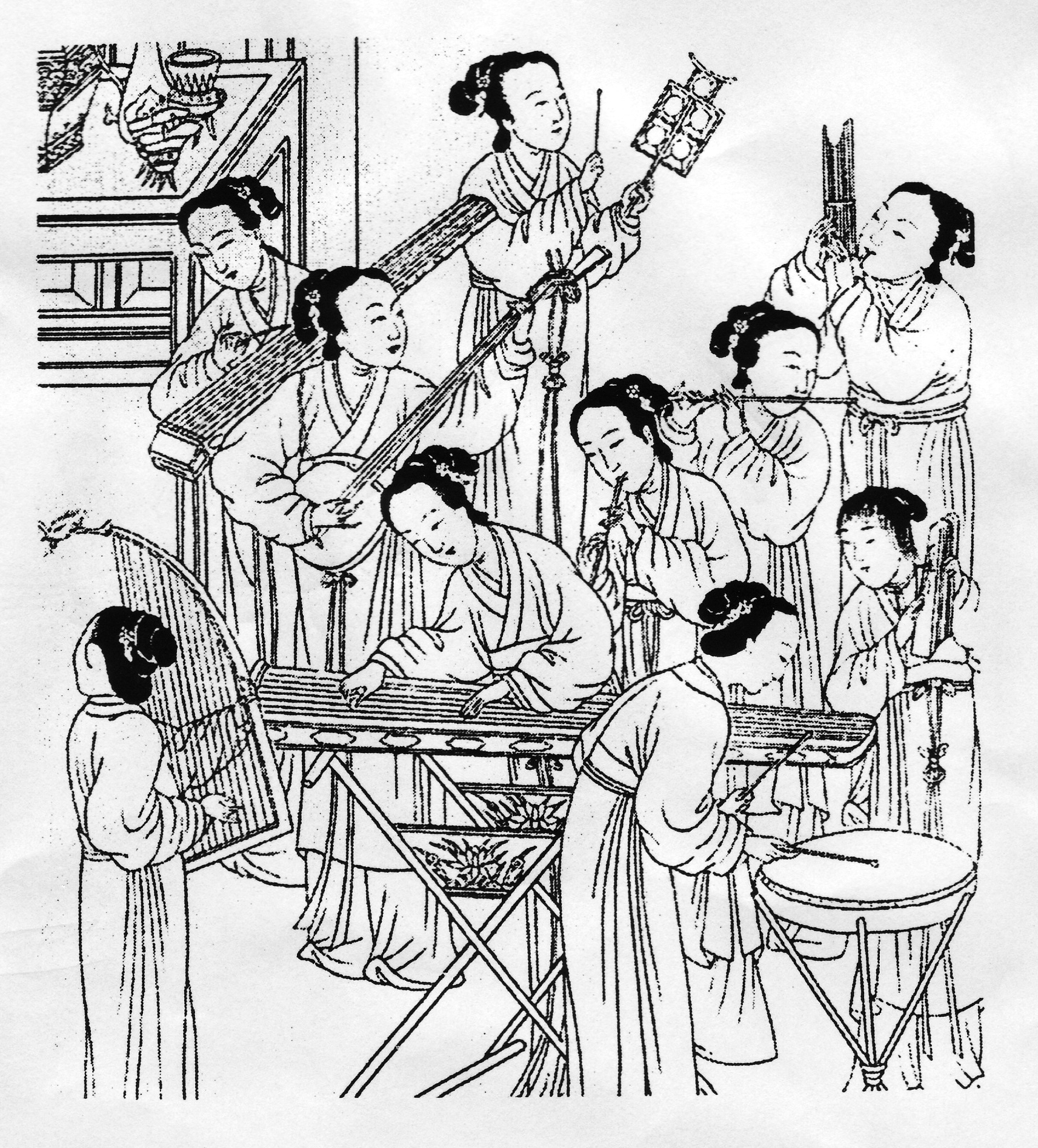
Ancient Chinese instrumentalists

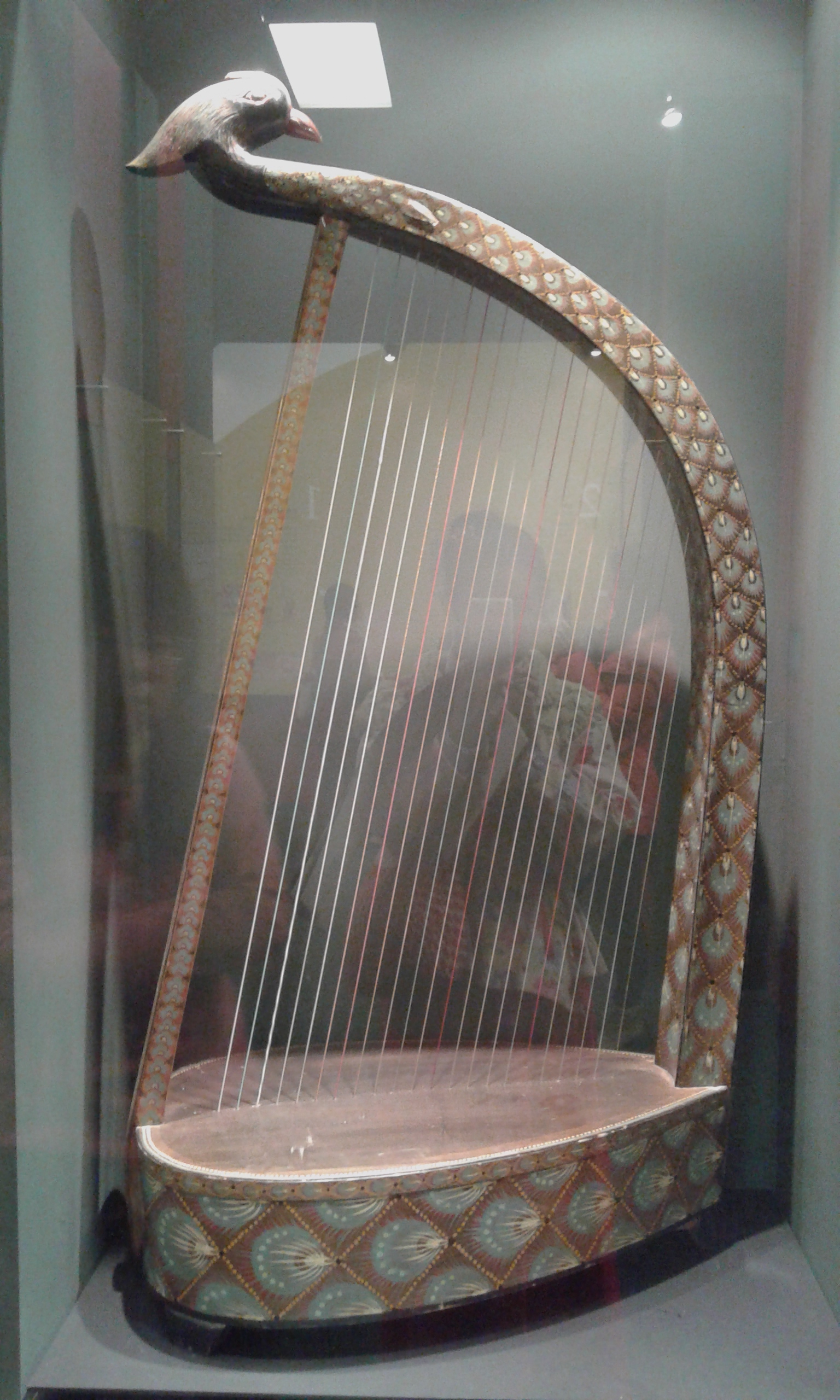
Phoenix-headed konghou (a type of harp), Tang dynasty (618–907). Presumably a reconstruction.

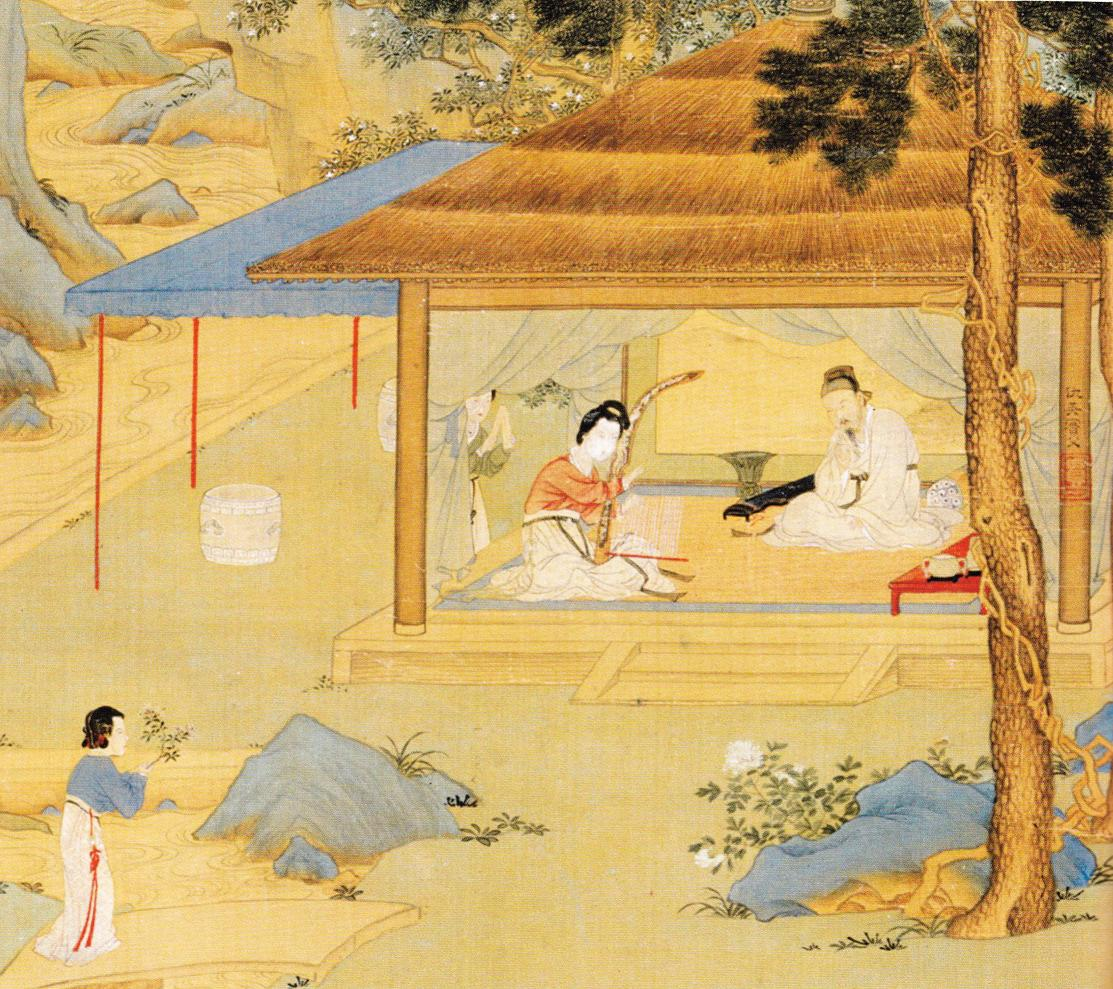
Woman playing konghou, details of a painting by Qiu Ying, Ming dynasty

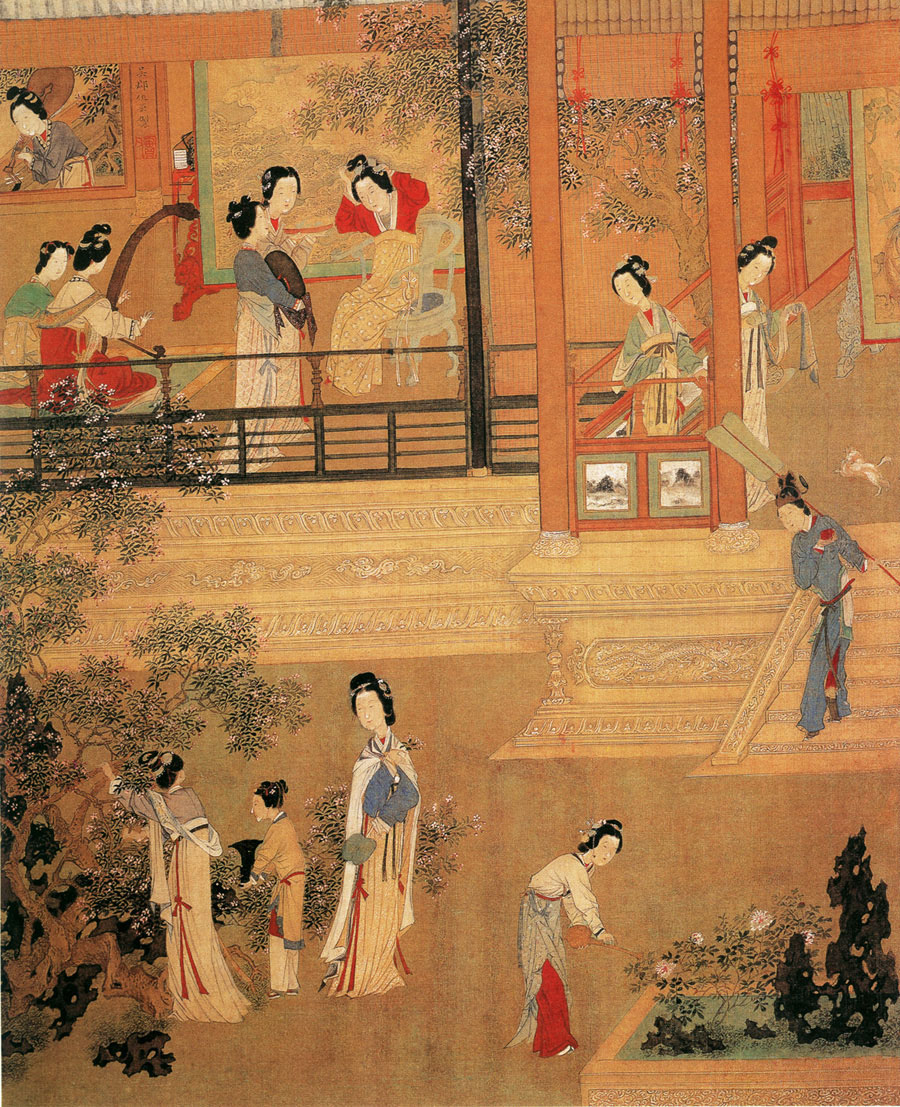
Konghou in women's sketching in the Ming dynasty

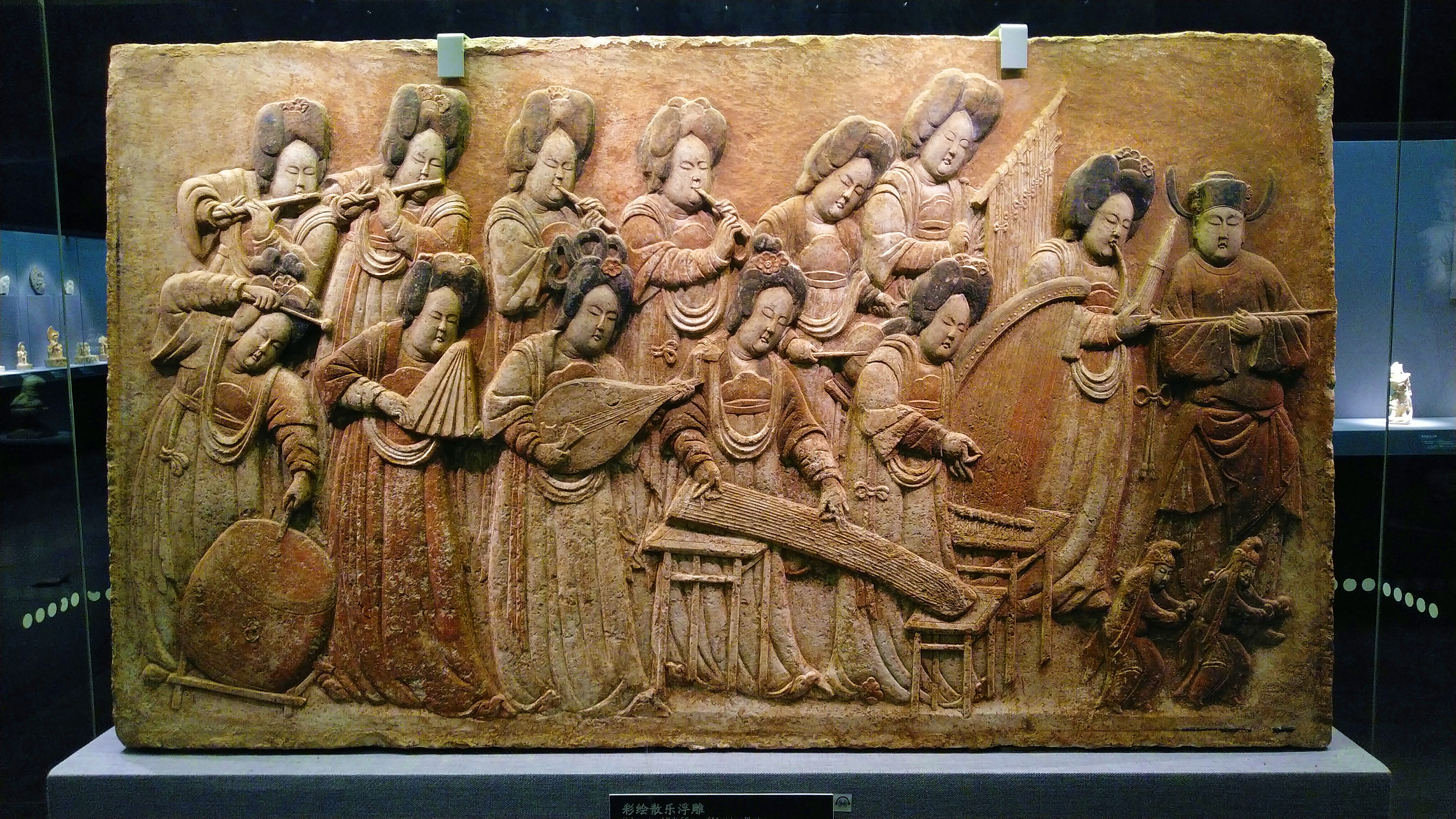
konghou in color-painted Relief Scene of Musicians Playing (Five Dynasties, China)
