= Angular harp =

Type of musical instrument

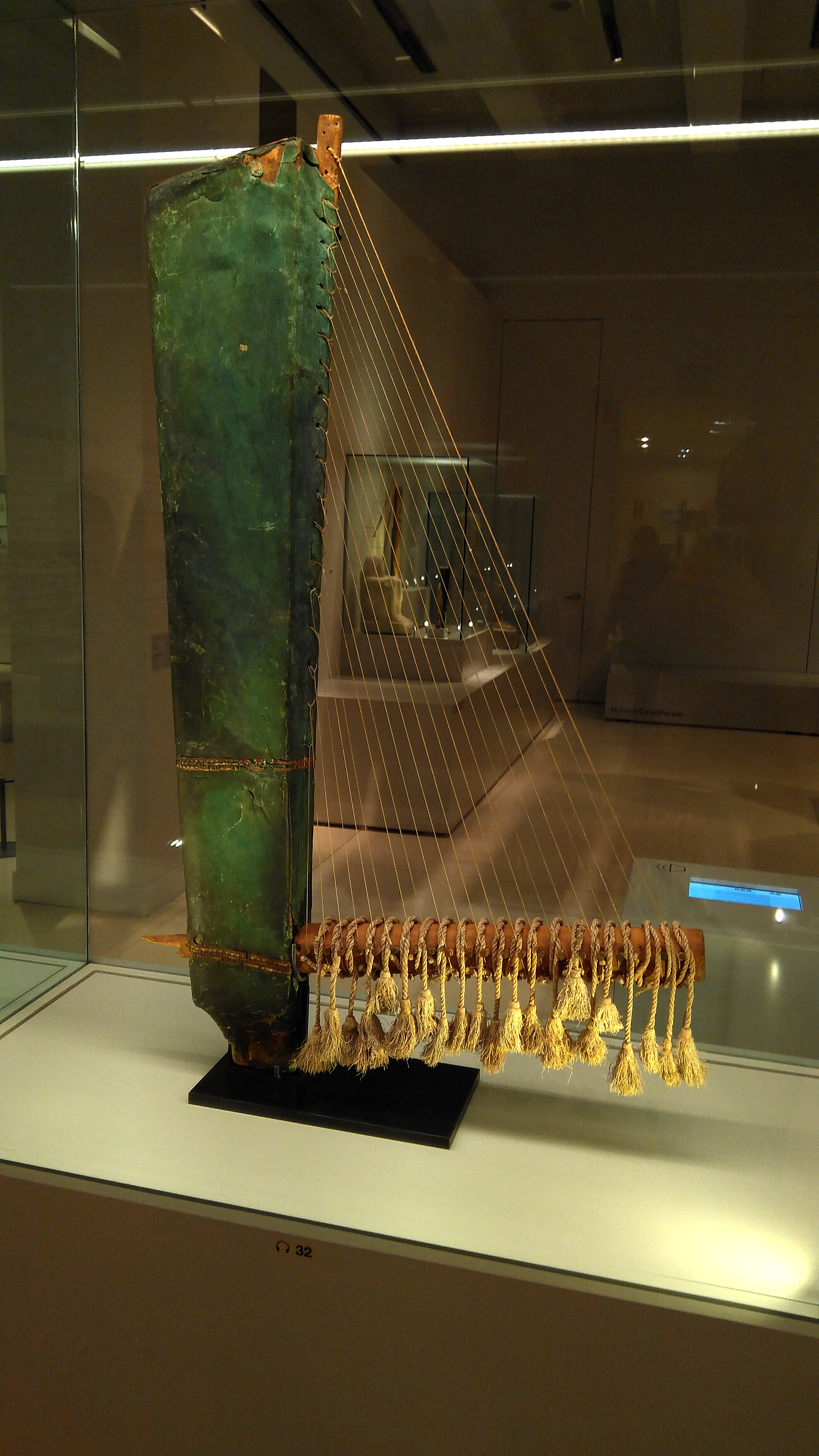
Egyptian angular harp (10th–8th century B.C.) Found at Thebes. The instrument has a pine wood mast (vertical bar under the green skin that the strings are tied to). The vertical wood box is made of sycamore and covered with skin, with a skin soundboard. The horizontal tailpiece is made of cedar. The strings are modern.

Angular harp is a category of musical instruments in the Hornbostel-Sachs system of musical instrument classification. It describes a harp in which "the neck makes a sharp angle with the resonator," the two arms forming an "open" harp. The harp stands in contrast to the arched harp or bow harp in which the angle is much less sharp and in which the neck curves away from the resonator (and can curve back above it in some harps). It also stands in contrast to the frame harp which is a "closed harp" and in which there is no opening between the resonator and the upper tip of the harp, but has a third side forming a triangle.

The first angular harps appeared in Mesopotamia around 1900 B.C. and spread throughout the ancient East. They existed almost unchanged until the 17th century as the standard type of harp in Asia. Both vertical and horizontal versions are known; the vertical or horizontal describes the direction to which the strings are oriented. In vertical harps, the harp is traditionally plucked with the fingers. With horizontally held harps, the strings are played by plucking or with a plectrum or pick in ancient representations.

== Description ==
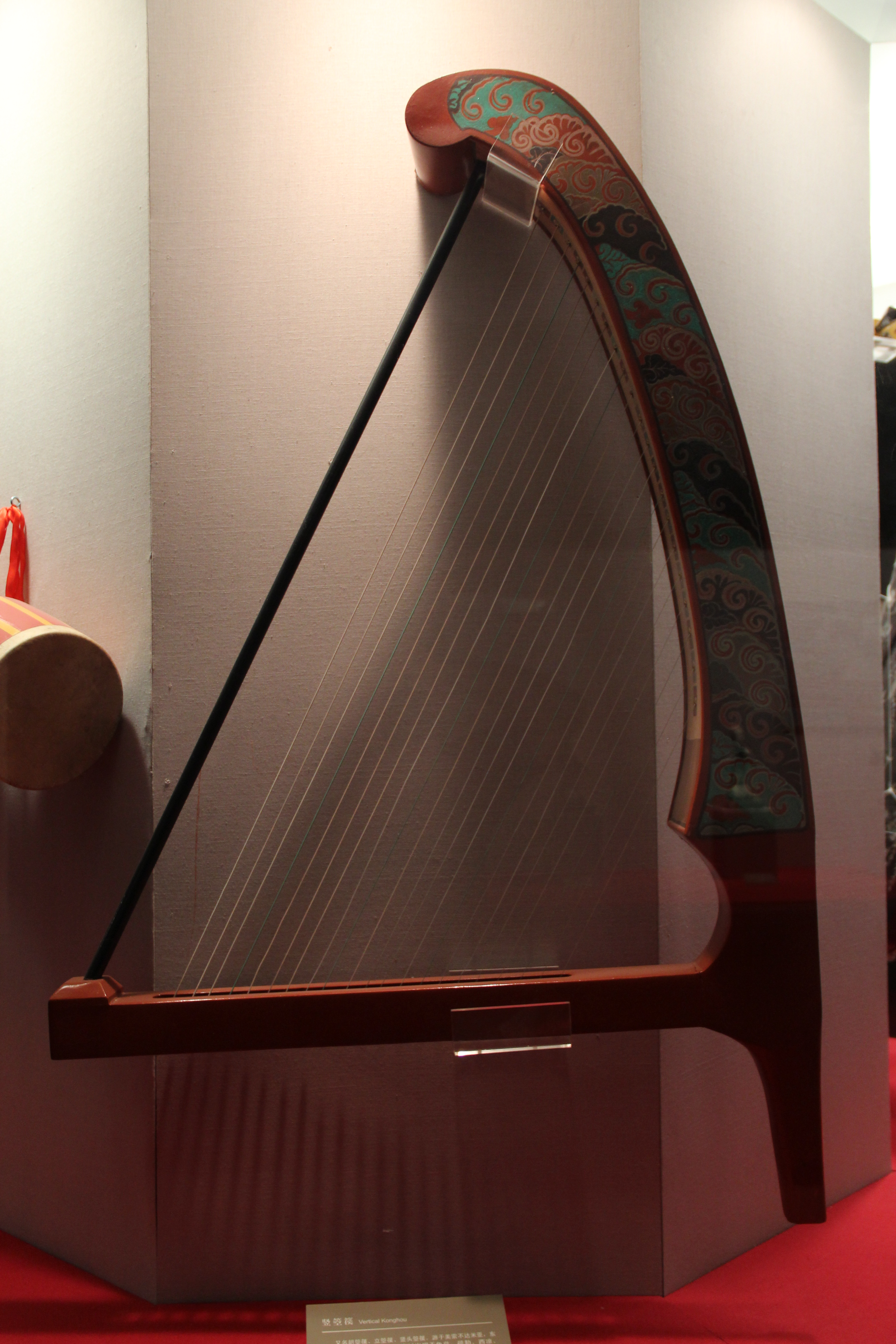
In this konghou vertical harp, the body curves forward. The body also extends downward below the soundbox, and the neck (horizontal) connects there.

=== Classification ===
Open harps include the arched harp and the angular harp. Frame harps are closed harps. The harp is a composite chordophone instrument; it belongs to those stringed instruments that have a distinguishable string-carrying neck and a body that receives the vibrations of the strings and emits them as sound, and its strings are stretched between the neck and the body. The defining feature of the harp is that the plane of its strings is—unlike from lutes—perpendicular to the sound-radiating surface (sound board) of the instrument body. If the body and neck are connected by a column, it is a frame harp, otherwise it is an open harp.

The angle harp is a variant of the open harp, along with the bow harp. The neck of the bowed harp is like an extension of its body, forming a continuous arc with it; in contrast, the straight neck of the angular harp fits the body at right angle or at an acute angle.

=== Structure ===
The body of the harp is an elongated, trough-like shape carved out of wood, the opening of which is covered by a thin skin or wooden sound board. A thin stick runs along its center line in the trough's opening, and the strings are anchored to the stick. The other end of the strings is connected to the neck, tied to the neck or to tuning pegs. The straight neck of the harp is attached either into the instrument body itself or into its extension. In a simpler case, the neck has a cylinder cross-section; the strings are connected to the tuning rings looped on it, and tuning can be achieved by rotating the rings. In later ages, the use of tuning keys was also widespread.

=== Variations ===
Variations of the angular harp

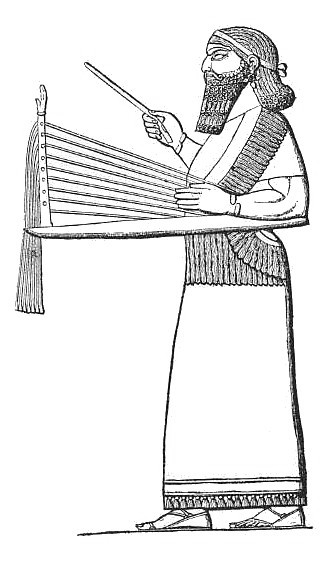
Assyrian horizontal harp with beater rod. In other images the rod is used as a pick.

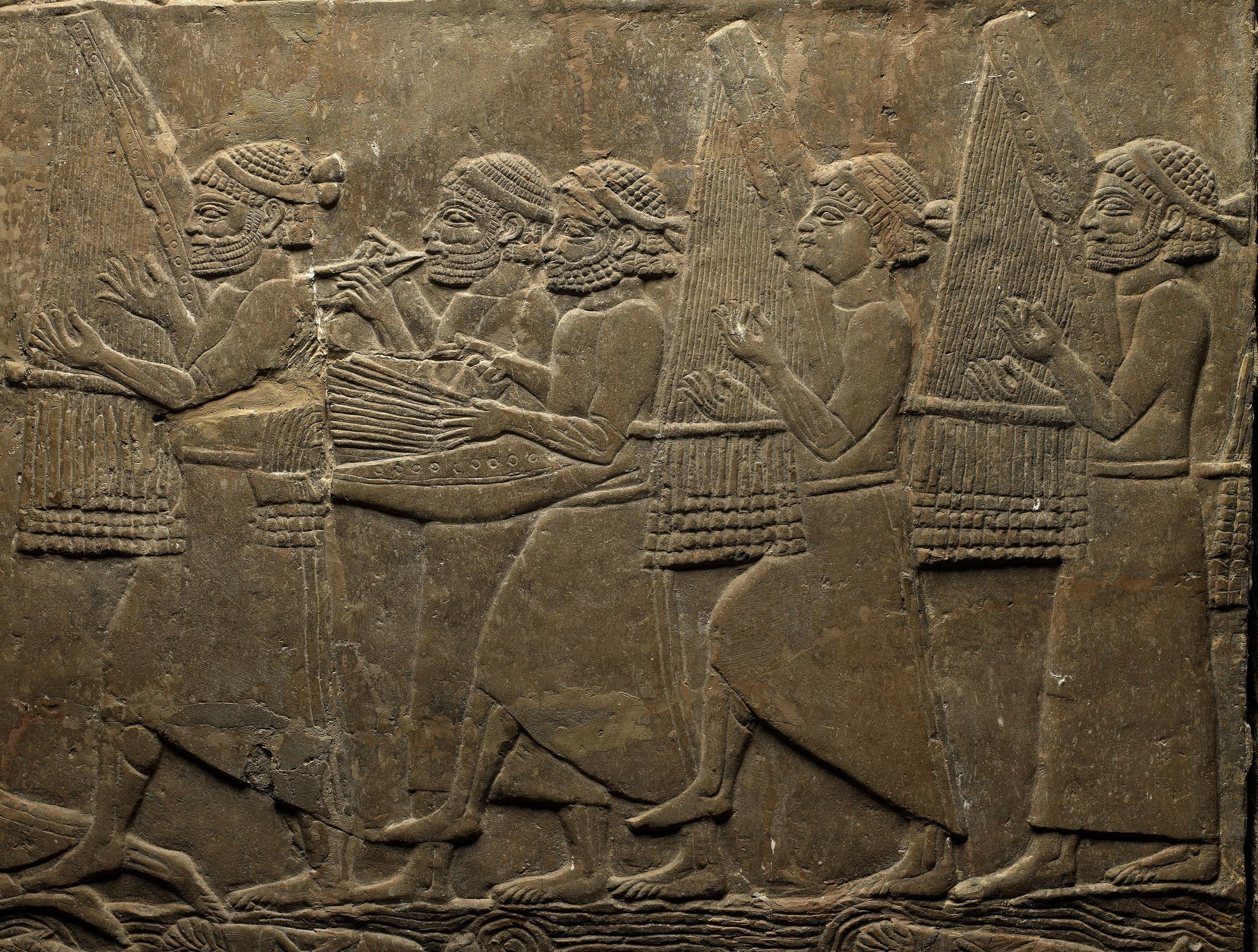
Elamite vertical harps

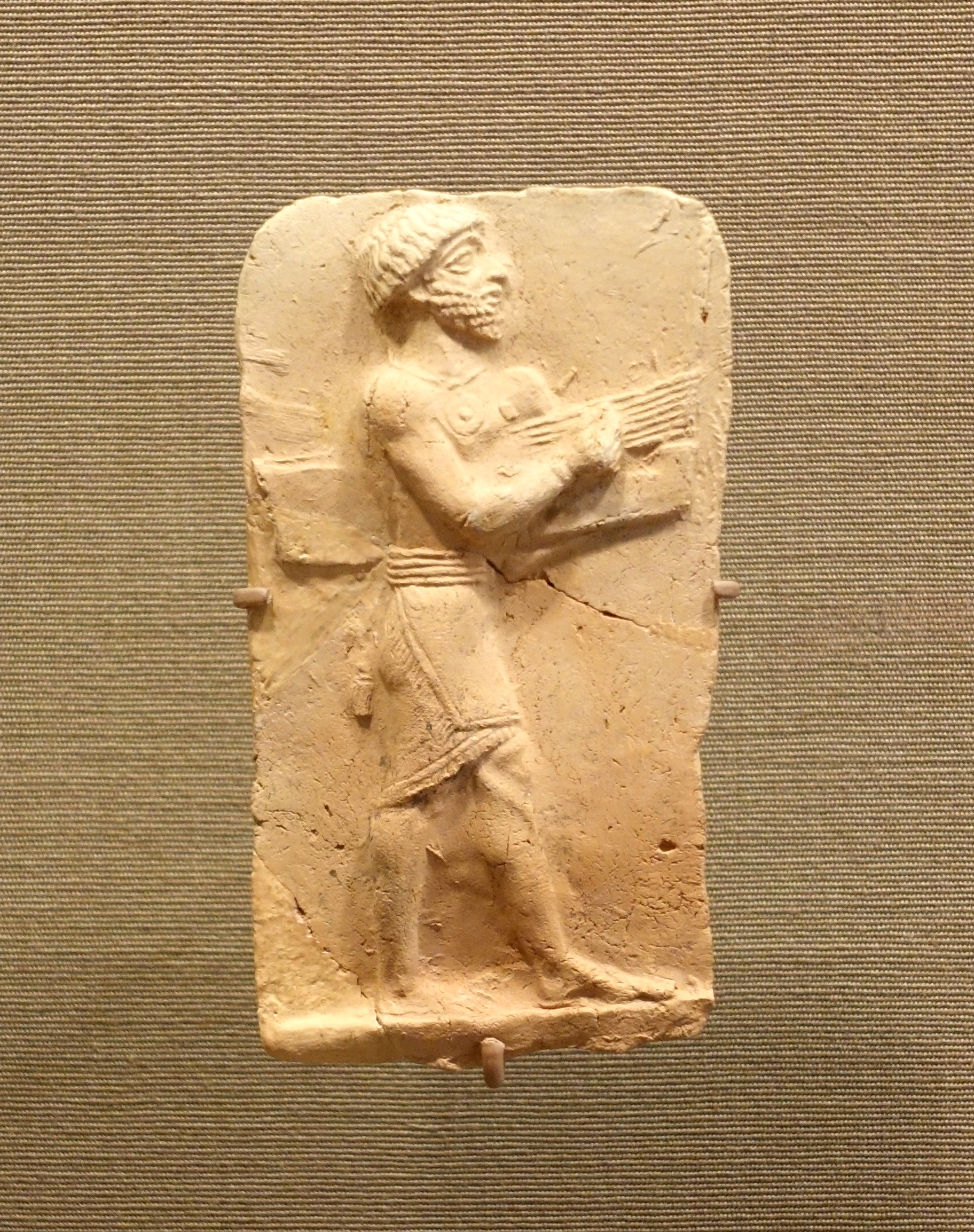
Horizontal angular harp, found at Tell Ishchali, Old Babylonian era, circa 1894 BC – 1595 BC.

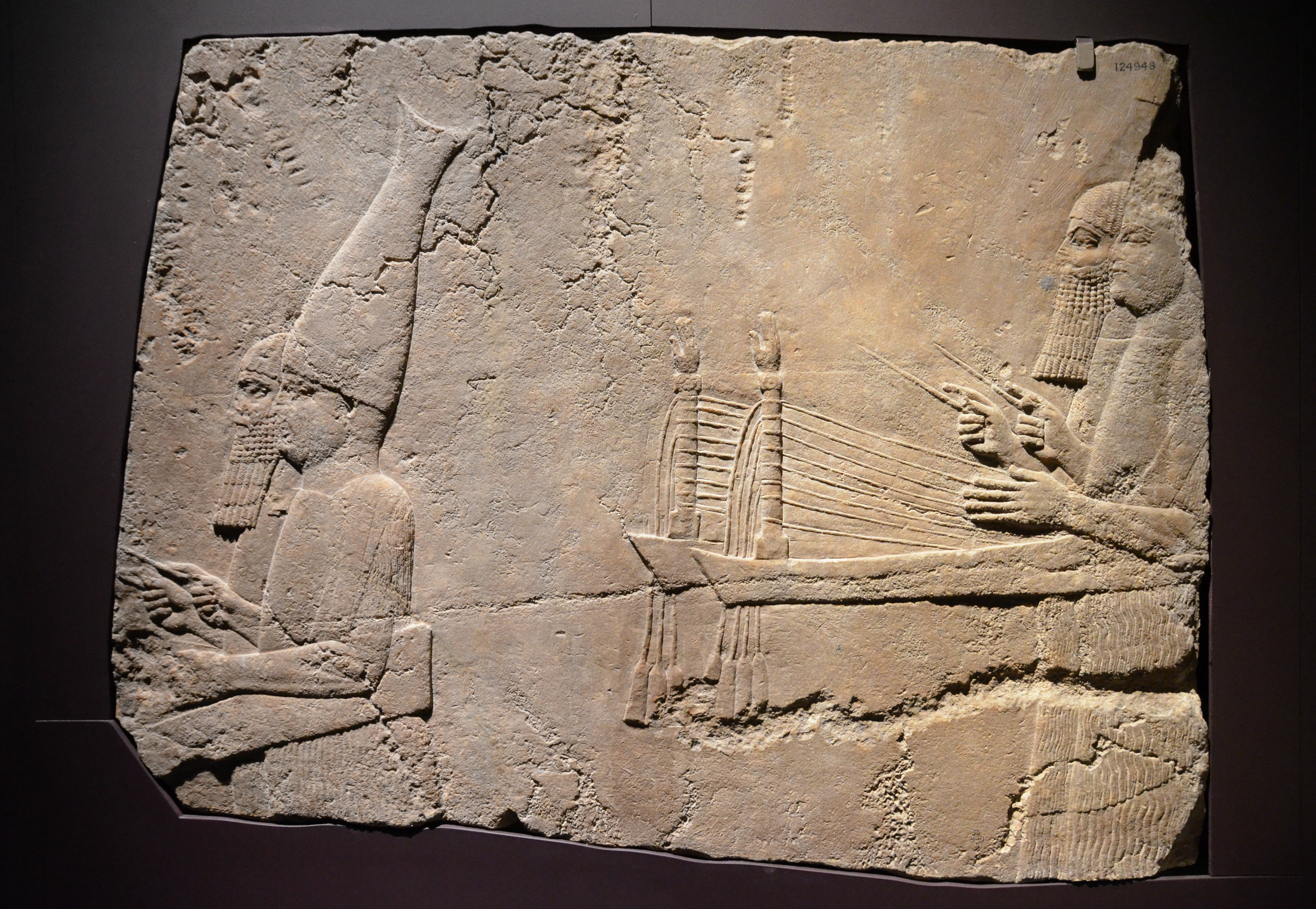
Detail of Assyrian harp technique, showing the left hand damping the strings.

Depending on how it is held and used, there are vertical and horizontal angular harps.

On a vertical harp, the sound box is vertical, resting against the musician or leaning forward. The strings are thus aligned roughly vertical, and the neck projects outward at the bottom of the instrument.

The sound box of the horizontal harp is held in a horizontal position. The neck extends vertically at the far end, in relation to the musician.

The vertical angular harp has 15–25 strings and is usually plucked with the fingers. The horizontal angular harp has less than 10, and in the illustrations it is sometimes played with a plucker or beater.

With vertical angular harps, the musician has both hands free to play the instrument, as the instrument rests against their body. With horizontal ones, the instrument is held under the left arm and played with the right hand. The left hand can dampen strings.

At the beginning of its history spanning thousands of years, the vertical harp had a robust structure, a straight, columnar body widening upwards, and a stout neck. The body of the instrument changed over time, curving forward from the musician.

The structure of the entire instrument grew lighter. In the case of the "light" type of harp, the neck was thinner and no longer connected directly to the sound box; instead it tapped into an extension that grows downward from the sound box. This extension often continues in a tail-like manner even after the point of connection of the neck; this supports the instrument when played in a seated position.

== Distribution, history ==
=== Ancient East ===
Early images, Ancient east and Cyclades

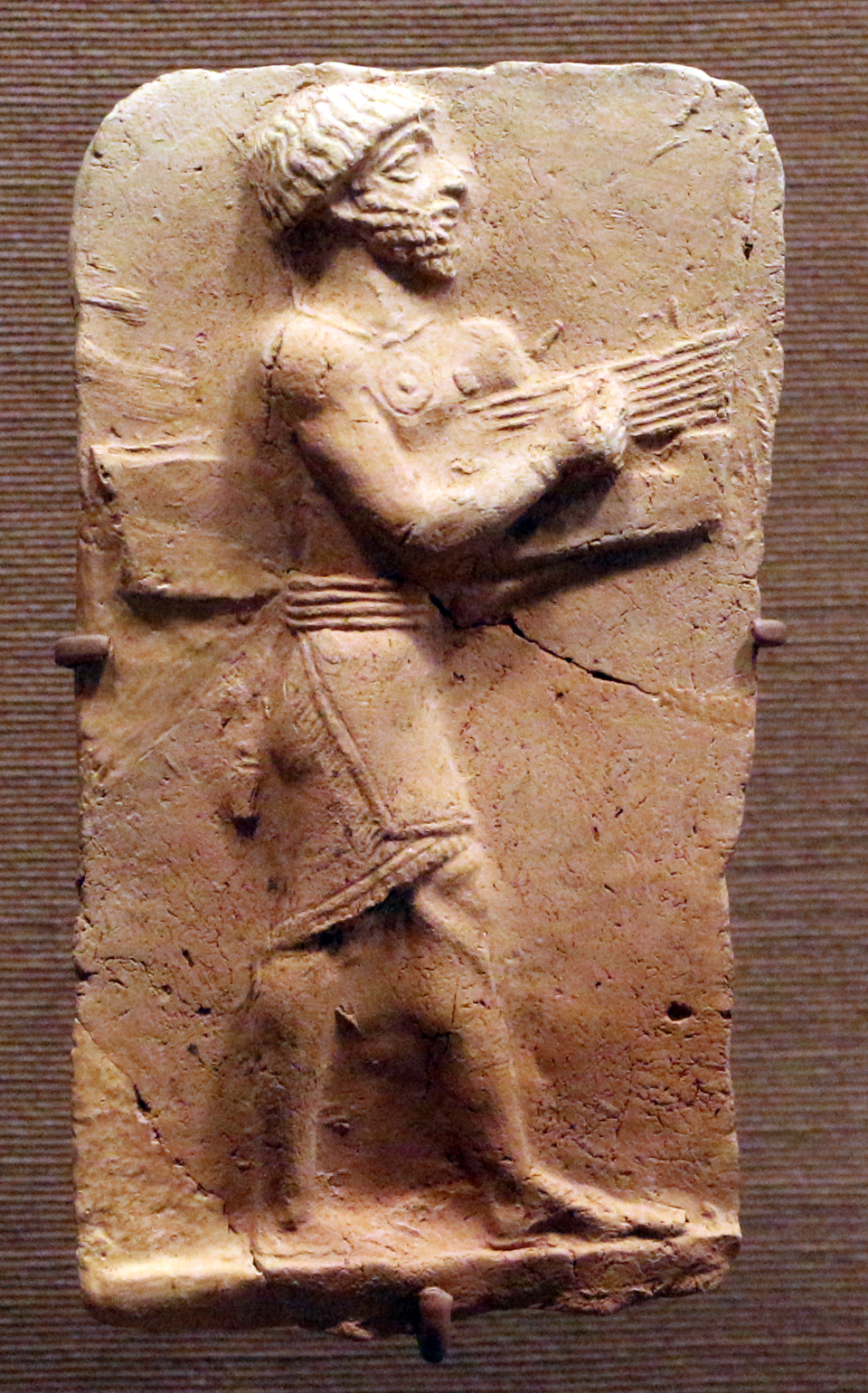
Assyrian horizontal angular harp, 2000-1500 B.C. Stamped terracotta from Esnunna (Tell Asmar)

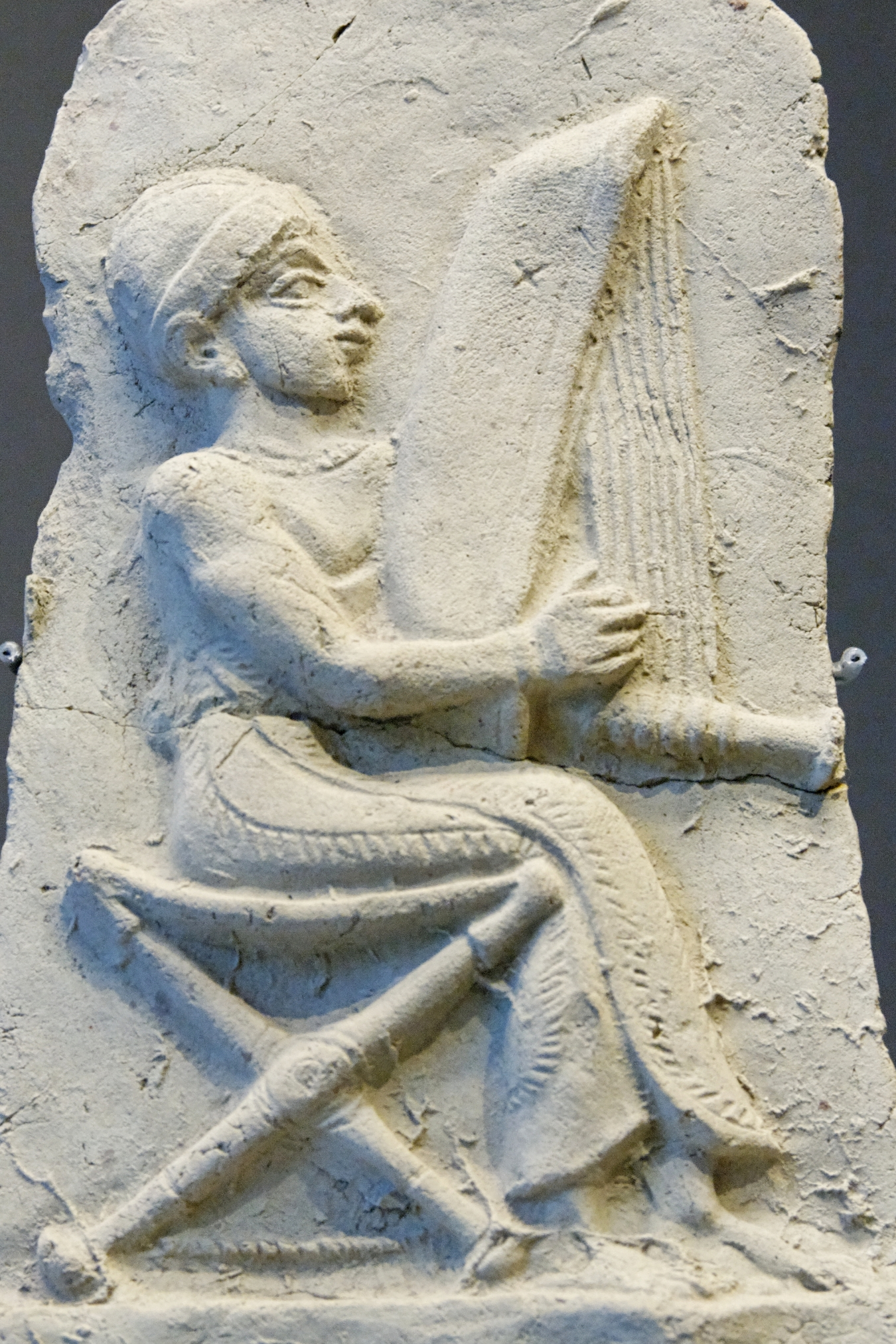
Vertical angular harp, Esnunna, 2000-1500 B.C. Stamped terracotta from Isin Larsa, Iraq

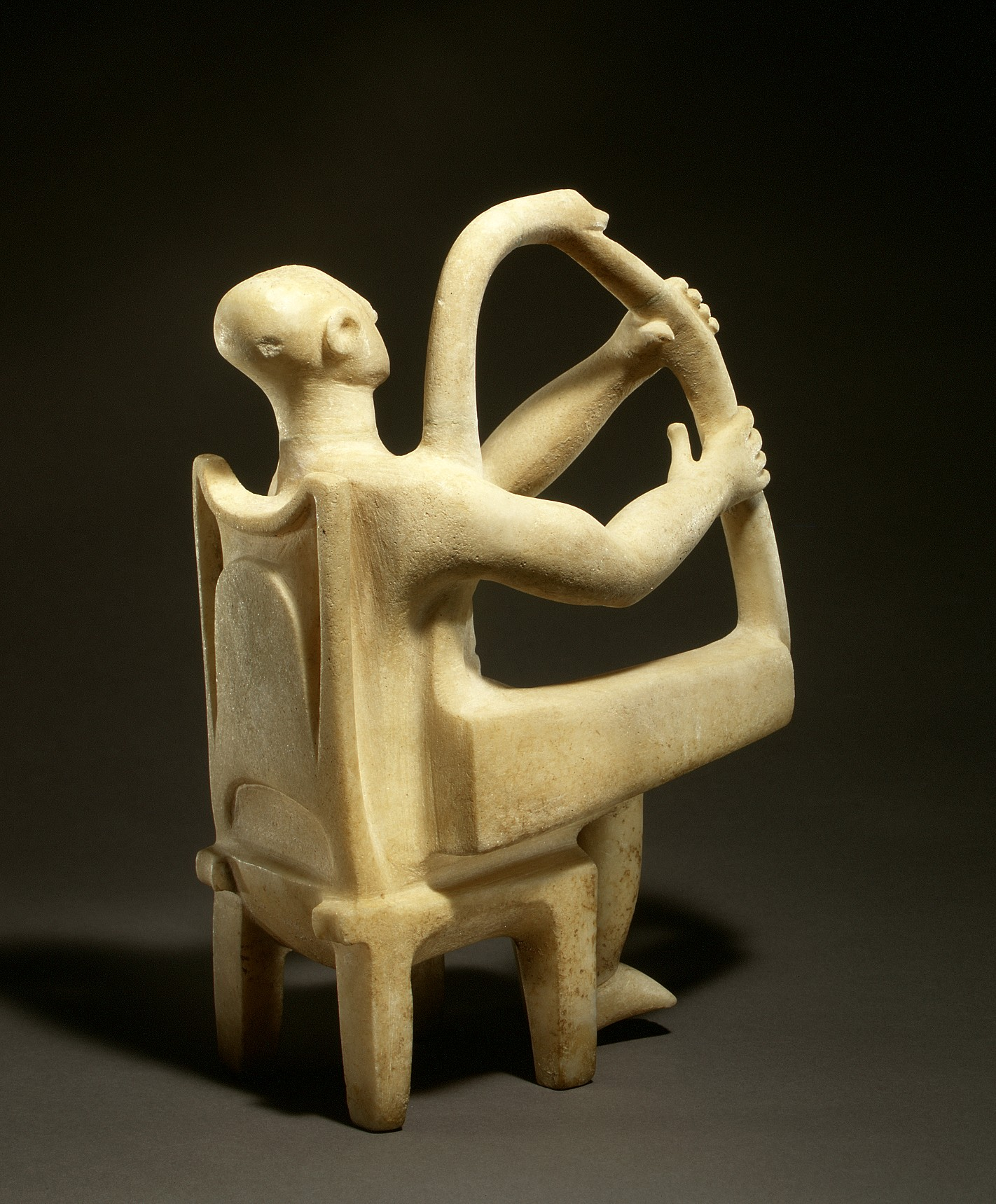
Cyclades sculpture showing early image of frame harp, circa 2800-2700 B.C.

The first known harps were bow harps (or arched harps), appearing around 3000 B.C. in Mesopotamia and Iran, then Egypt and India. The angular harp appeared around 1850 B.C. and supplanted the bowed harp in its homeland of Mesopotamia and Iran. Over time, the angular harp became the most widespread type of harp in the Middle East and later throughout Asia, except for India. Early representation of the harp appear in artwork in the second and first millennia B.C. have survived to be seen on Mesopotamian terracotta tiles. In Egypt, the angular harp was introduced five centuries later, in the 15th century B.C., but it coexisted there with different versions of the bowed harp.

Also among the earliest representations of the frame harp are sculptures from the 3rd millennium B.C. Cyclades, in which a man is seen with the outline of a frame harp.

=== Greeks ===
Greek angular harps

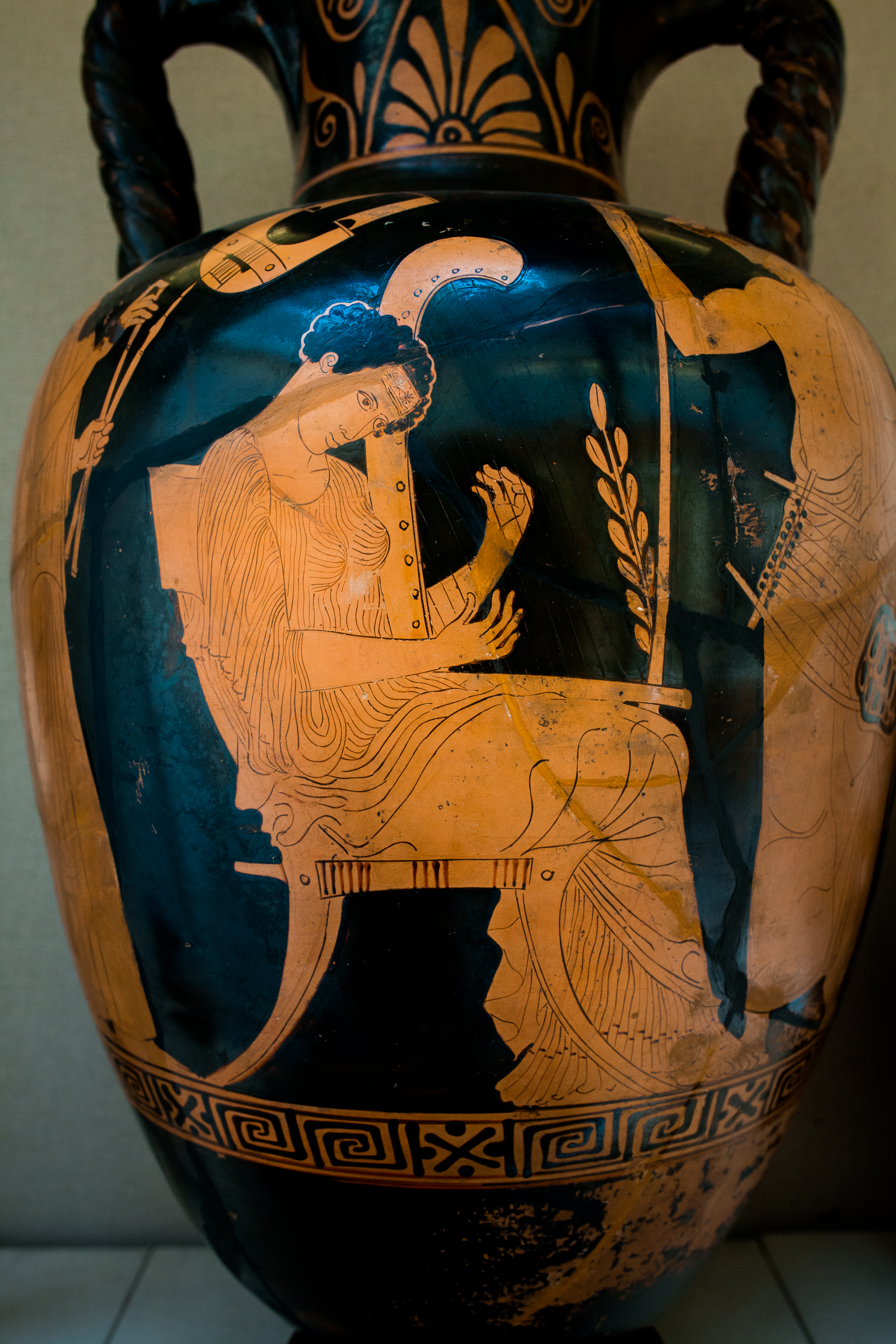
Open angular-harp. Image with open-harp considered possible trigonon in the Grove New Encyclopedia of Musical Instruments.

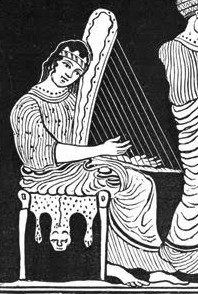
Open angular-harp. A muse with a harp. Text following image: "The trigonon consisted originally of an angular frame..."

In the ancient Greek vase paintings, angle harps with curved bodies appear from the second half of the 5th century B.C. In poetry, from the beginning of the 6th century B.C., there is an instrument called pektis, considered to be of Lydian origin; later Attic writers also mention a multi-stringed instrument called the trigonon or trigonos (τρίγωνος = 'triangular'); these could have been angular harps. According to the testimony of the vase paintings, the Greeks sometimes put a third side onto the angular harp, inventing the 3-sided frame harp. These types of harps disappeared; in the later Hellenistic world, it was not the Greek harps, but the oriental angular harps that spread everywhere in an almost identical, standardized form.

Among the Greeks, the trigonon was an angular harp, and likely the magadis, sambuca and pektis also were.

=== Steppe zone ===
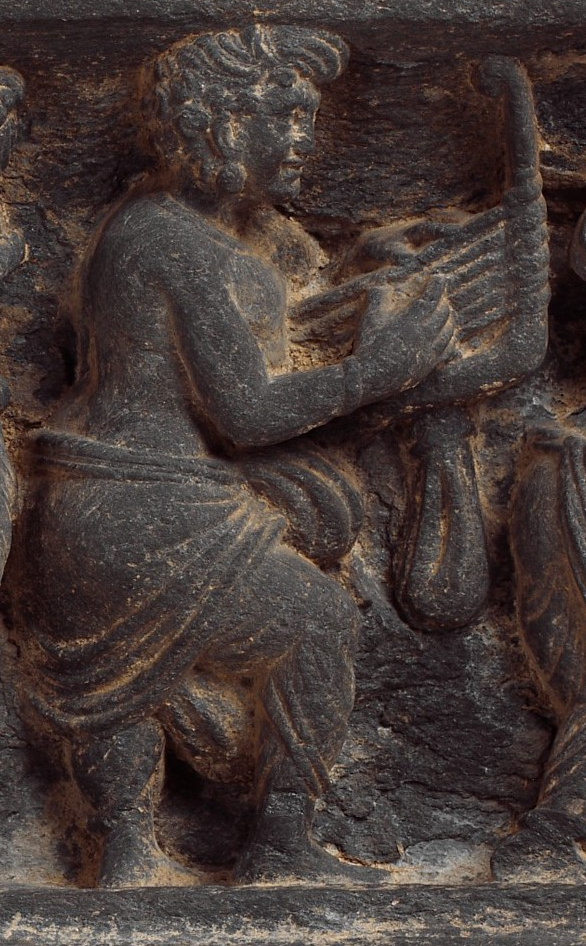
Gandhara, horizontal angular harp, circa 1st century A.D.

During excavations on the edge of the Eurasian steppe zone—at the site of Pazirik in the Altai Mountains, and then in Xinjiang in northwestern China—several harps in relatively good condition have been unearthed from the 5–4th century B.C. In their construction and shape, these are very similar to the horizontal angular harps that can be seen on Assyrian reliefs from around 700 B.C. The difference is that, in contrast to the nine strings of the Assyrian harps, these are uniformly five-stringed. According to assumptions, this type of Assyrian harp may have spread across the steppes through the mediation of the Scythians and other equestrian nomadic peoples.

=== Persia and Islam ===
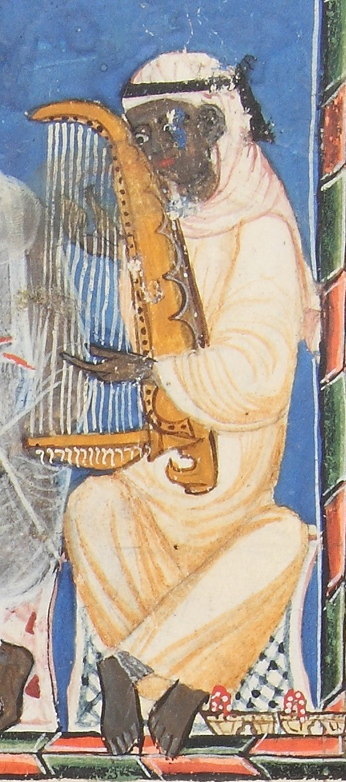
Book of Games of Alfonso X el Sabio, Spain, (1283).

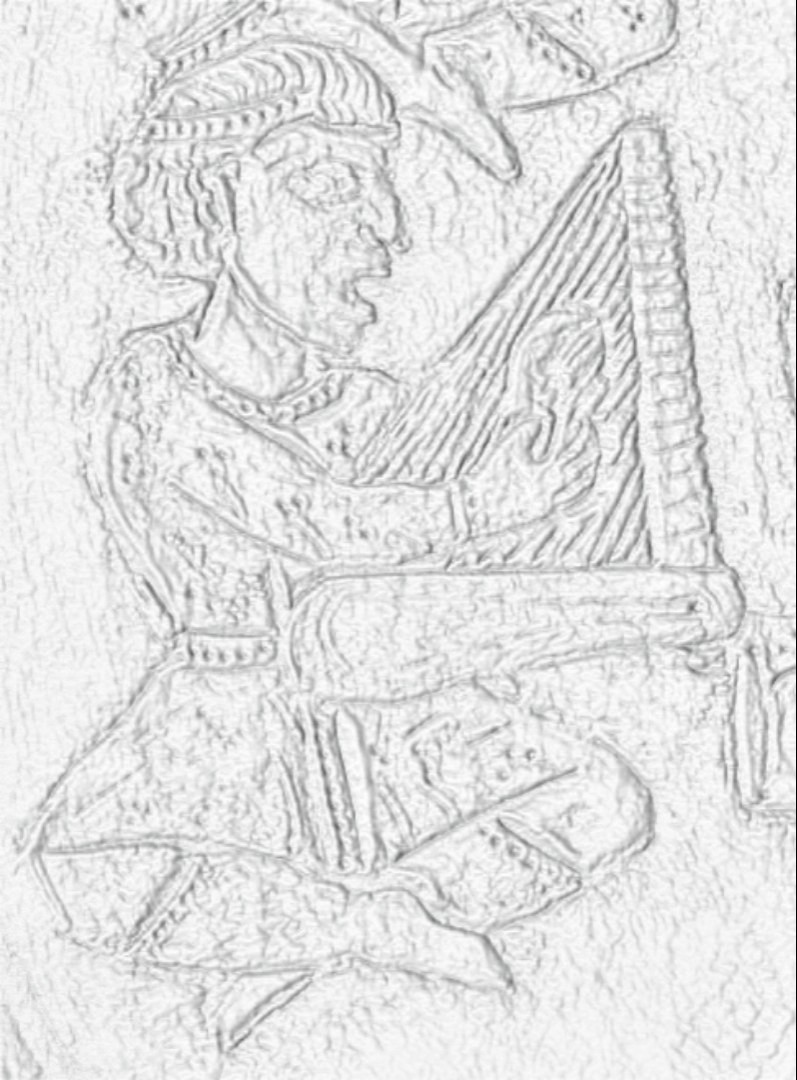
Persian harp, circa 8th century A.D. Found near modern Perm, Russia.

Music played a particularly important role in the Iranian-centered Sassanid Empire, partly in connection with the Zoroastrian state religion. Many different instruments were used, among which the harp occupied a prominent place. The iconographic data suggest that the concept of the harp was strongly associated with royal dignity. Among the harps, the form prevalent in the Hellenistic era was the dominant one, but towards the end of the era, around 600 A.D., the "light" type of harp was already formed, which later as the chang became dominant during the conquest of Islam, and then spread throughout the Muslim world from Iran to Spain.

=== China, Buddhism ===
Central Asia, China

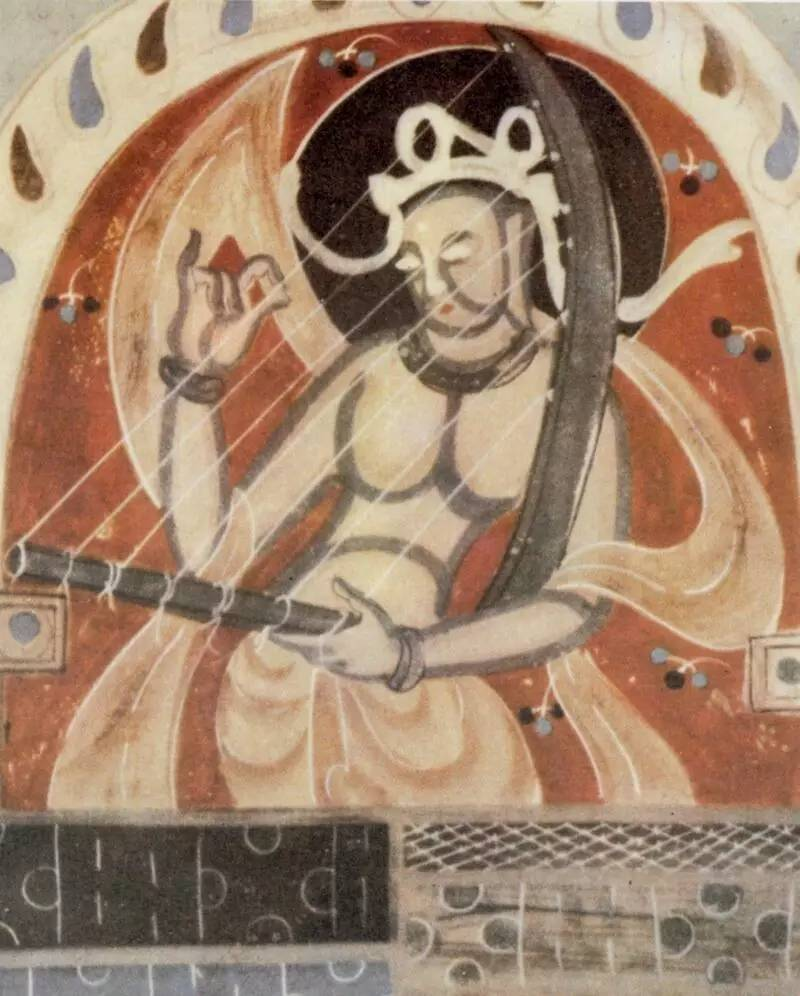
Konghou harp, from the Northern Wei dynasty era (365–535 A.D.)

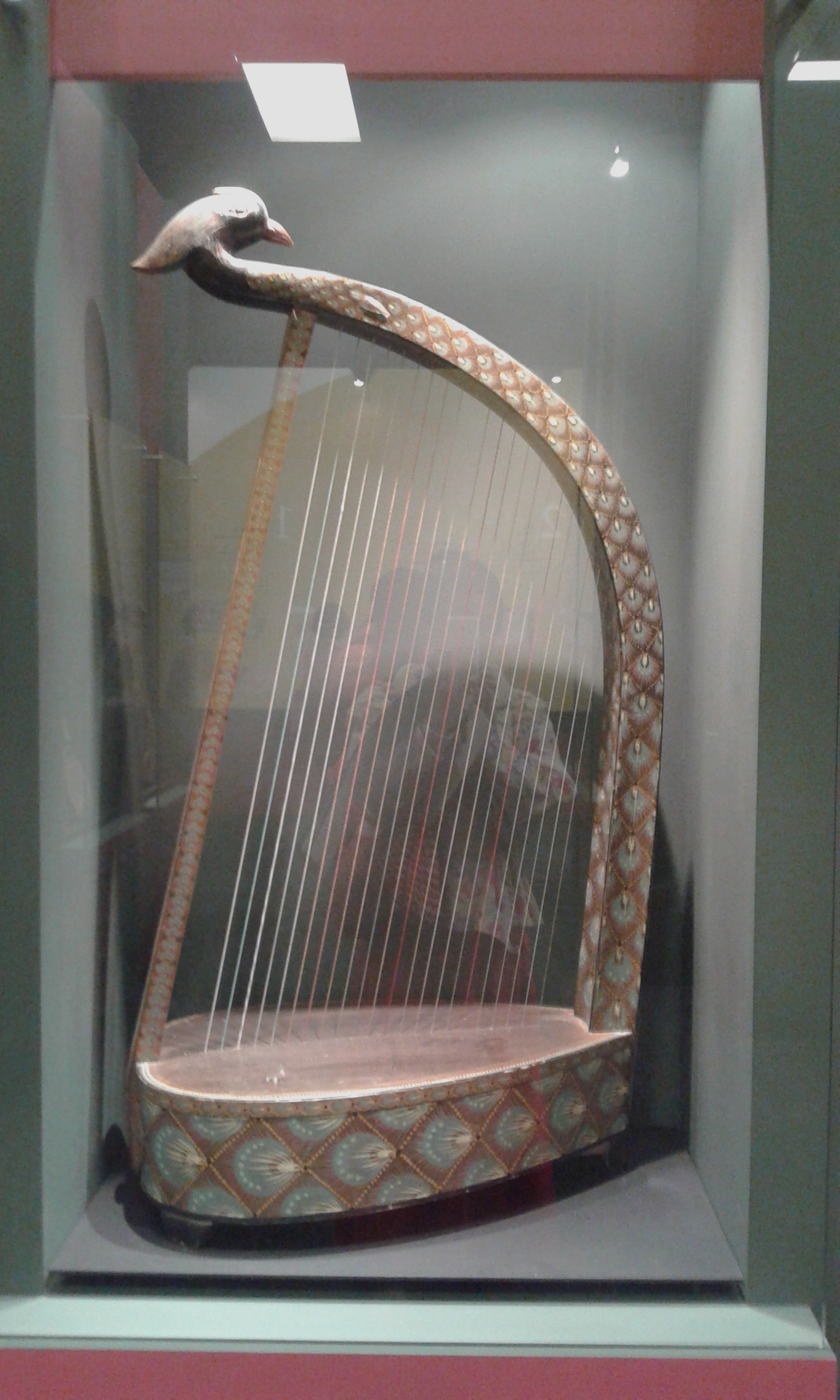
Phoenix-headed konghou (a type of harp), Tang dynasty (618–907).

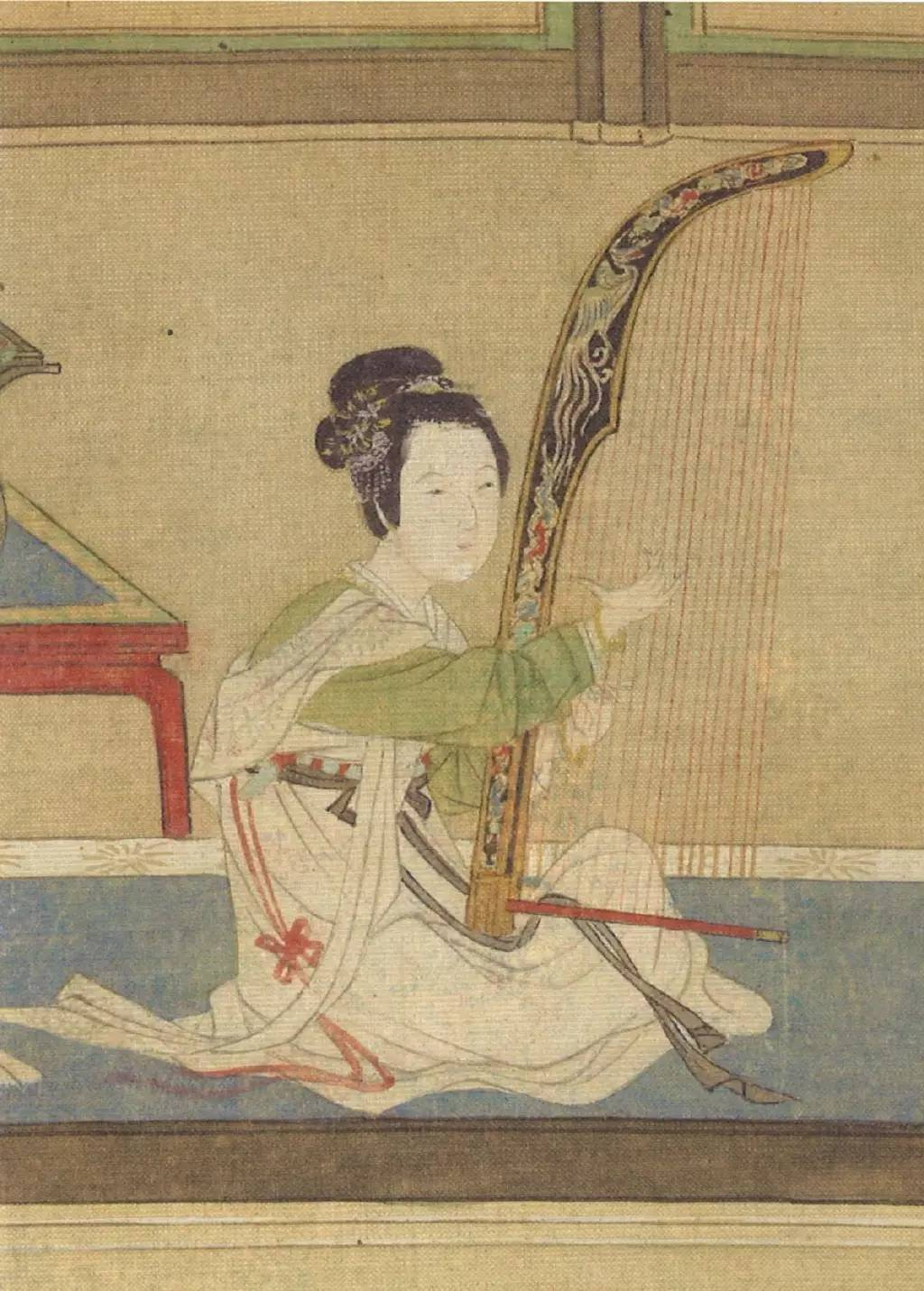
Konghou from silk painting by Qiu Ying (仇英) (1494–1552), "Spring Morning in the Han Palace"

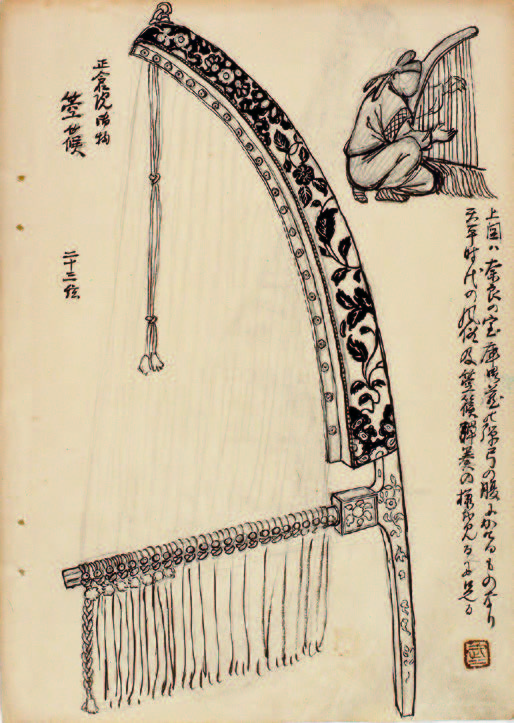
Japanese sketch of angular harp, 19th century

The angle harp traveled along the Silk Road east, and made it to China between 200 B.C. and 200 A.D. Another world religion, Buddhism, also accepted the harp and took it to the Far East, to China and then to Korea and Japan. During the Han dynasty, China joined the Silk Road, the western part of which passed through the areas where the harp was established at that time. Through musicians and merchants, the harp gradually made its way further east; this process can be traced by dating the depictions of harps along the Silk Road. In China, the spread of the harp was closely connected with the spread of Buddhism. Its heyday was during the Tang dynasty. In China, Korea, and Japan, the harp had different names, but the instrument itself was essentially the same, and everywhere it was connected to the Buddhist religion. The harp, along with many other "foreign" instruments, disappeared from China around 1100 during the Song dynasty with the decline of Buddhism.

=== Decline ===
The harp continued to be present in Muslim musical culture, and the instrument is often featured on the miniatures of Persian illustrated books between 1300 and 1600 A.D. From 1600 onwards, the depictions increasingly show that the harp had fallen out of use by then, and the painters were limited to their memories. The Turkish traveler Evliya Çelebi found only ten harp makers and ten harp players in Istanbul around 1660, while he was aware of 2,000 lute players.

The relegation of the harp to the background probably stemmed from the difficulties of tuning the many strings and the fragile and vulnerable nature of the instrument. The lutes covered at least the same sound range with much fewer strings, and their structure was more robust.

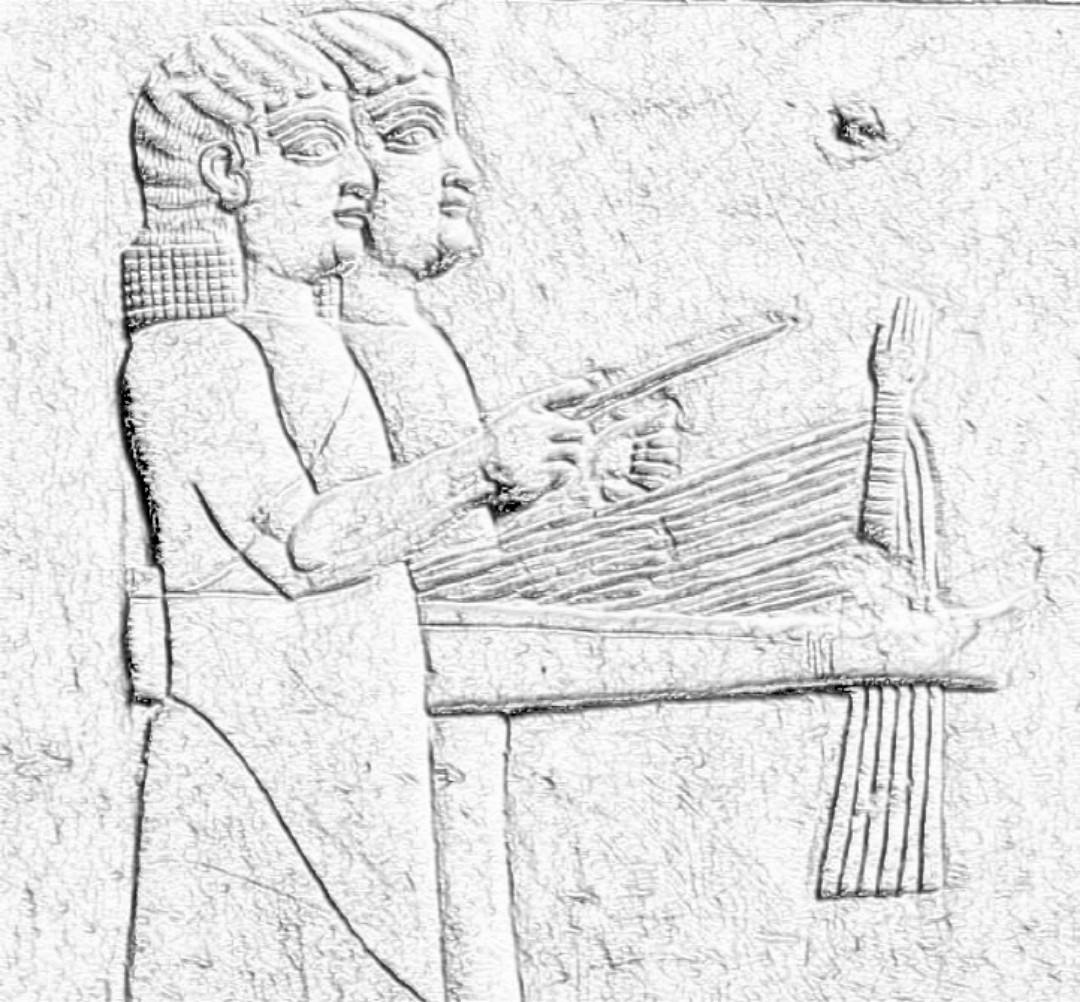
Harpist with horizontal arched harp. Neo-Assyrian angular horizontal harp, 645BC-640BC

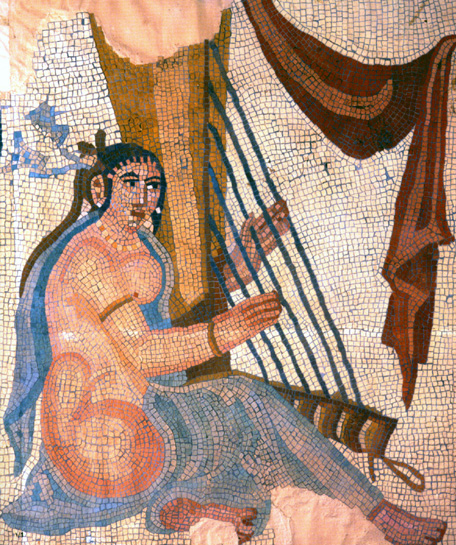
Woman playing an angular harp in a c. 260 AD Sassanid era mosaic excavated at Bishapur

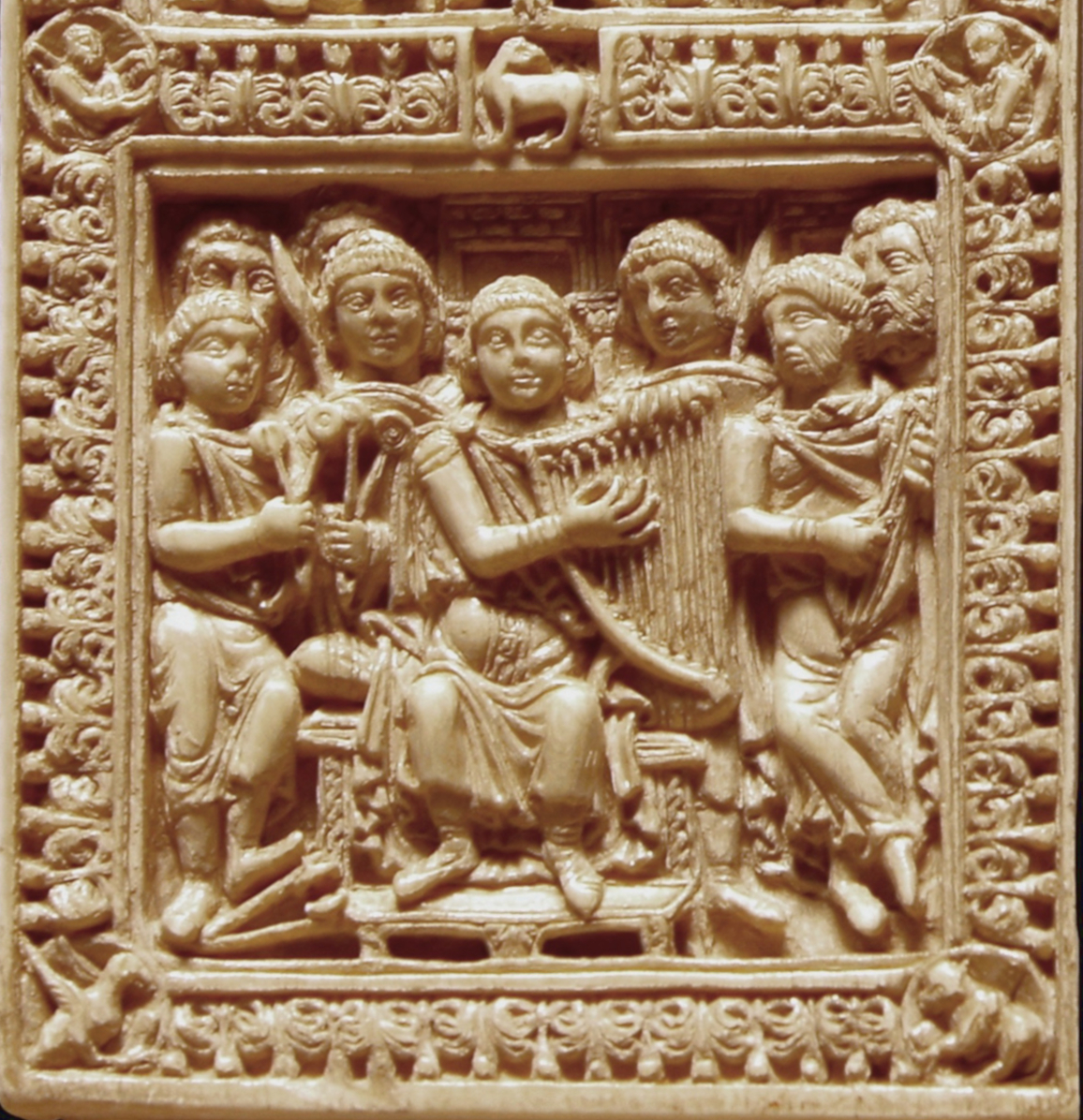
Dagulf Psalter, artwork for cover, late 8th century CE, Carolingian Empire

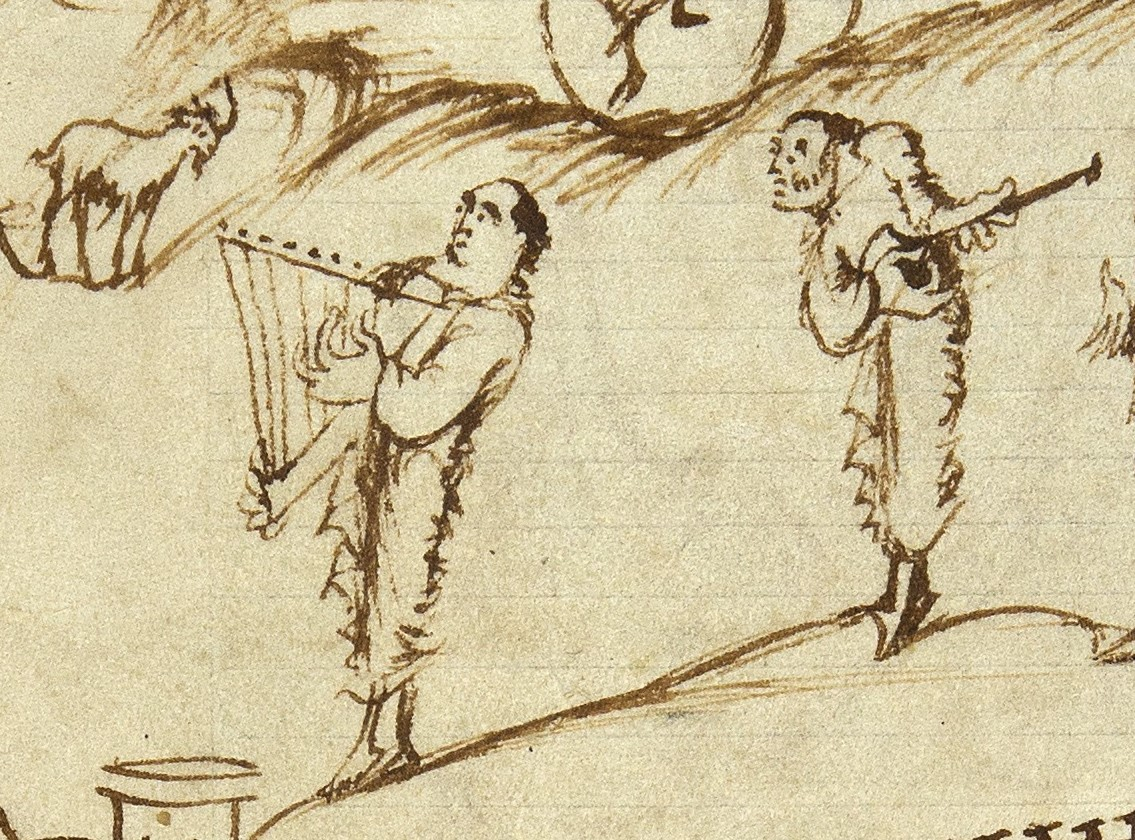
9th century A.D., Carolingian Empire. Harp and lute depicted in the Utrecht Psalter

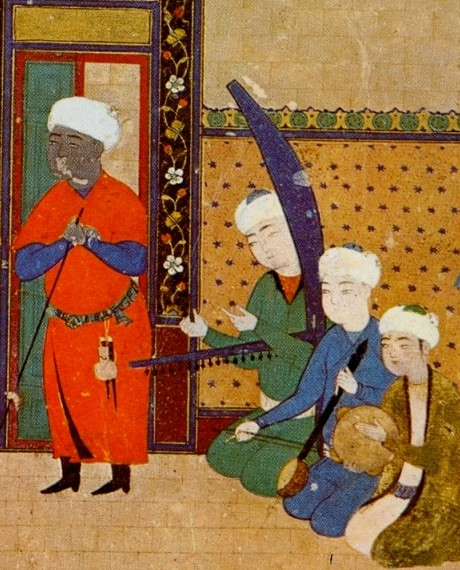
Angled harp on a Persian miniature, Bukhara, Uzbekistan, 1523–1524.

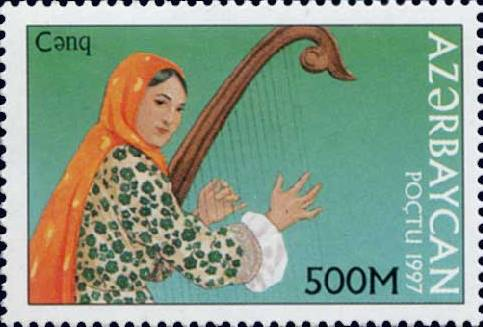
The harp is still a traditional instrument in Azerbaijan, as seen on a stamp

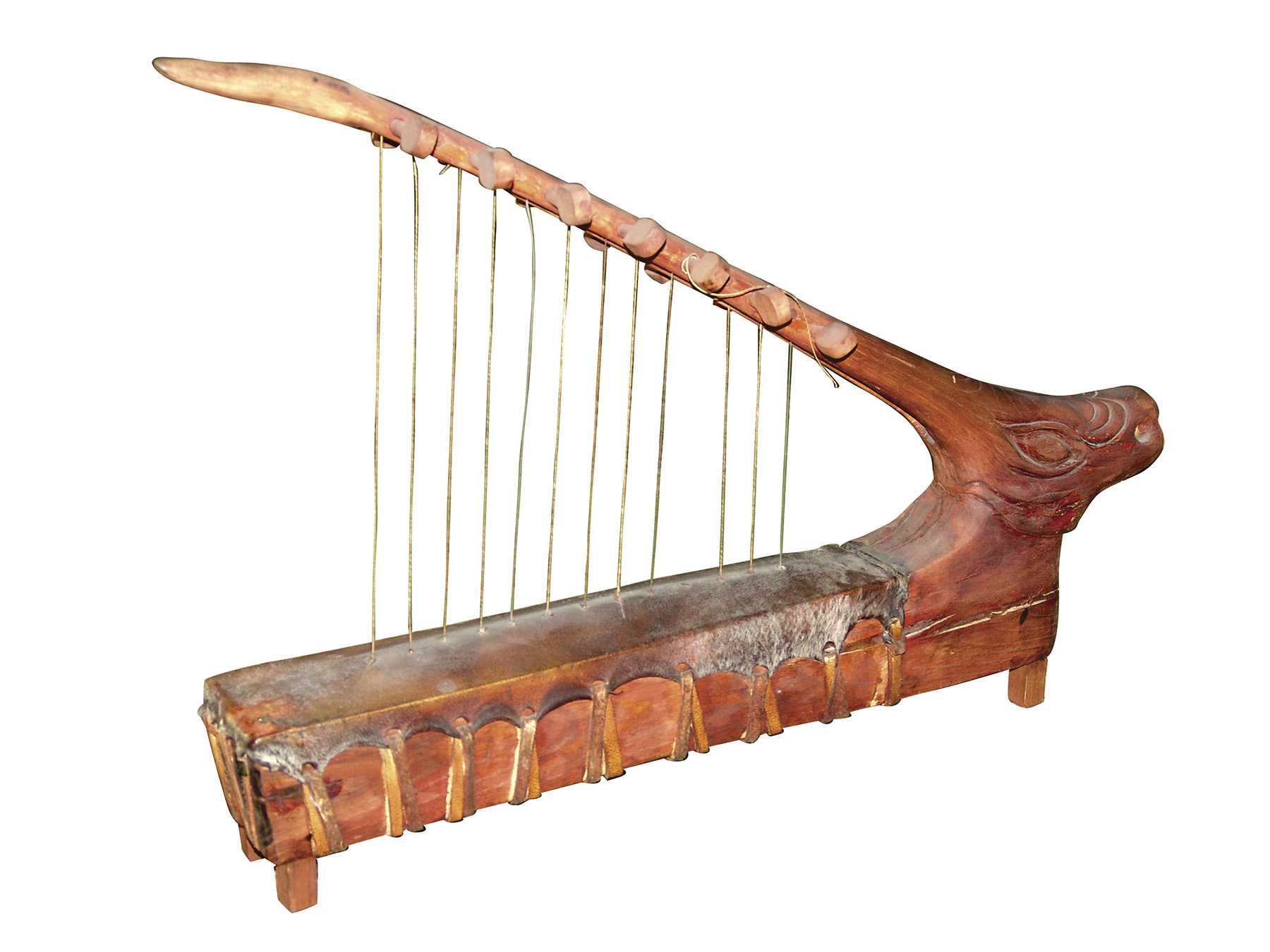
Kazakhstan. Adyrna harp.

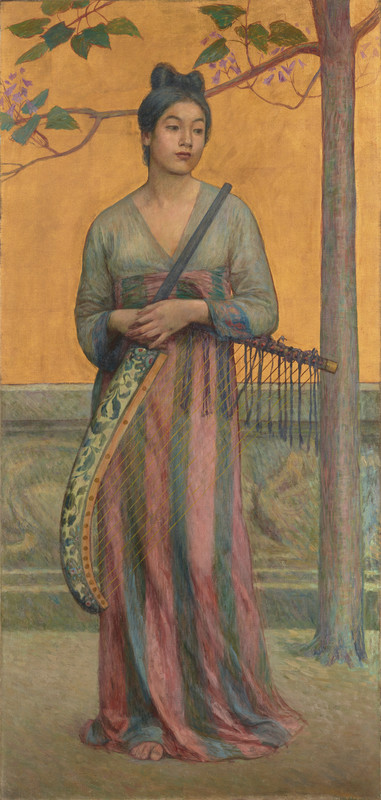
Japan. Kugo (箜篌), a Japanese angular harp.

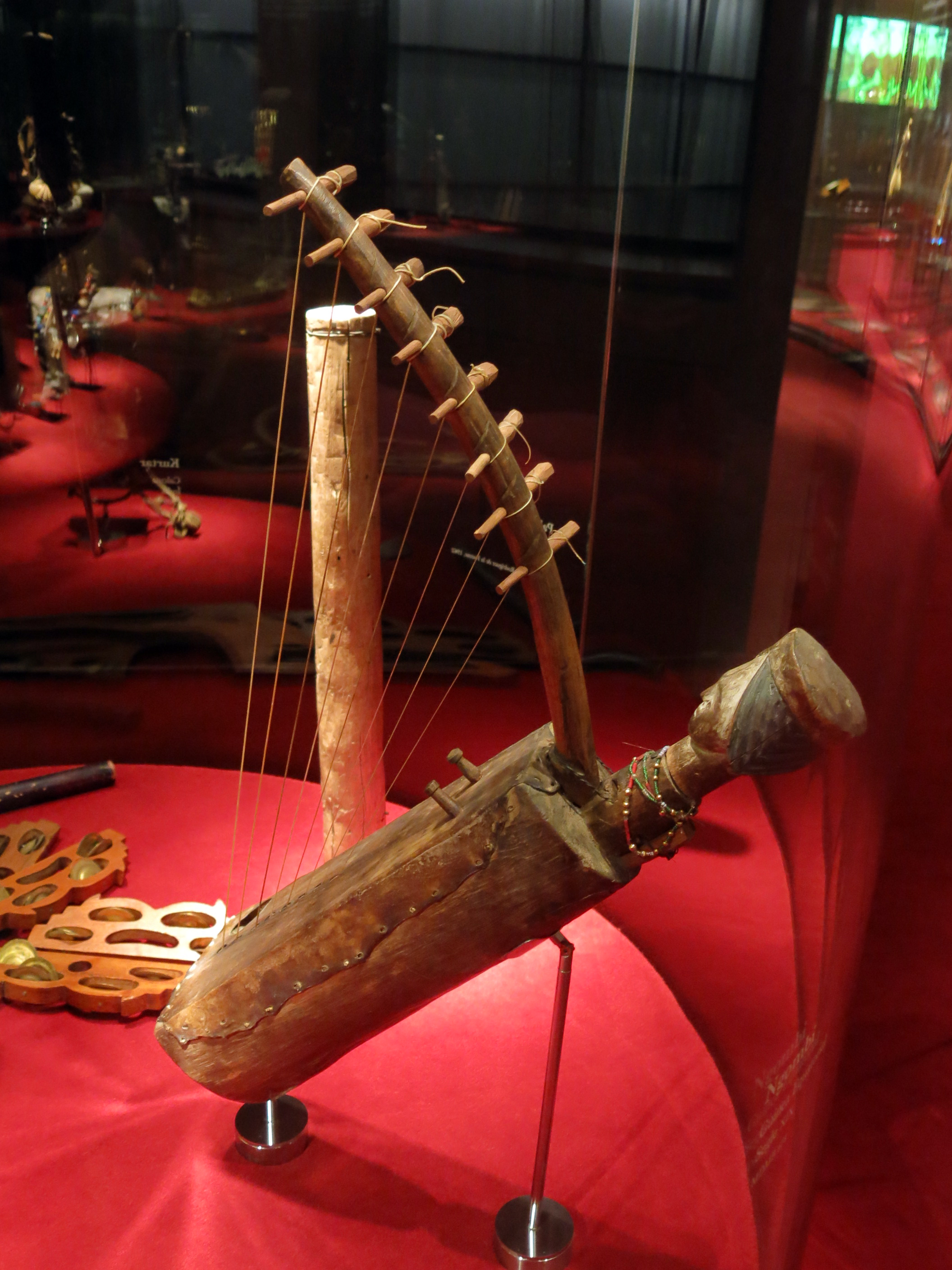
Ngombi. Equatorial Guinea. First half 20th century. Many African harps are arched harps; the Ngombi comes close to being angular.

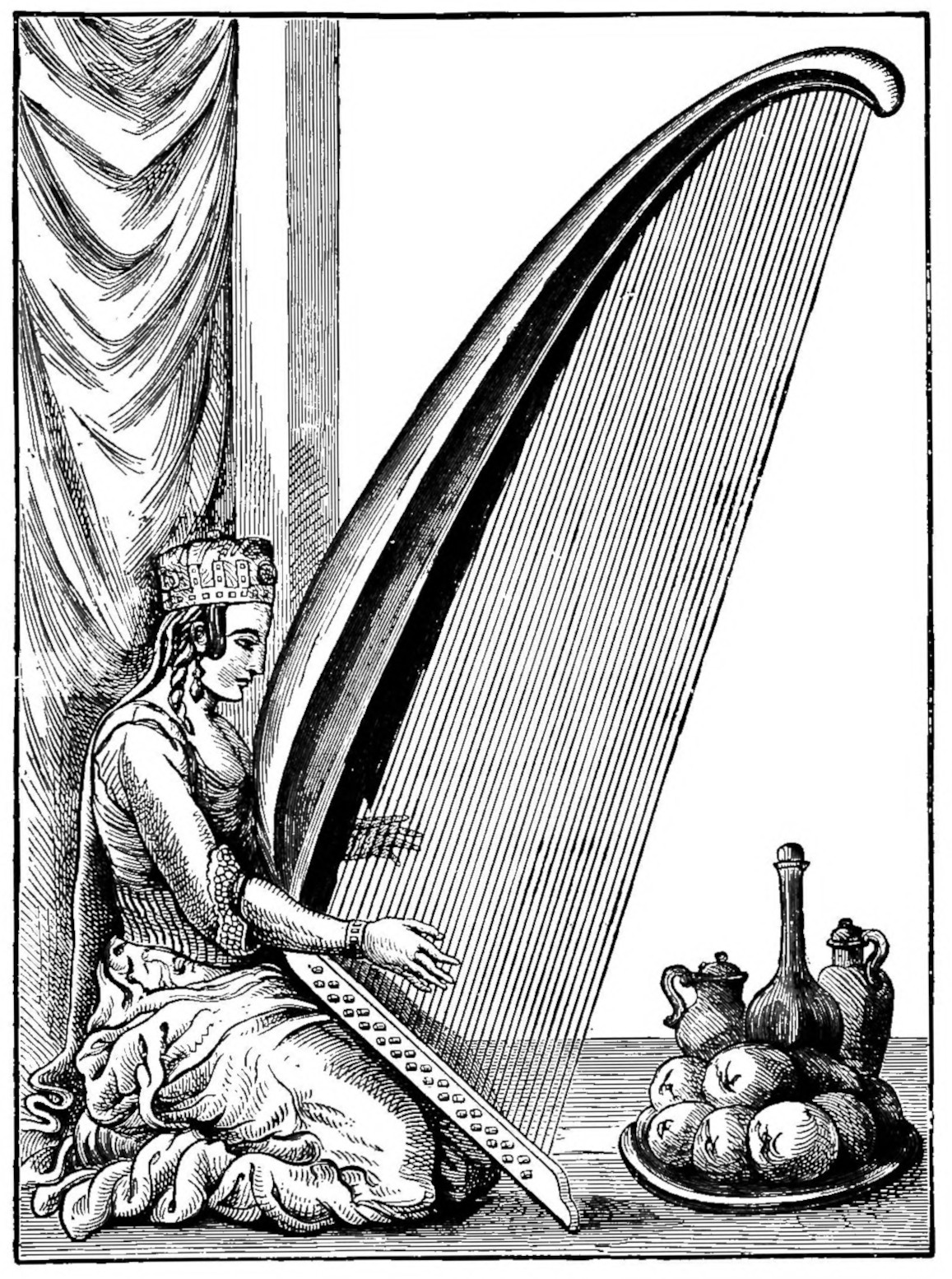
Turkish woman playing the harp, 17th century A.D. Harp has pegs on bottom of instrument.

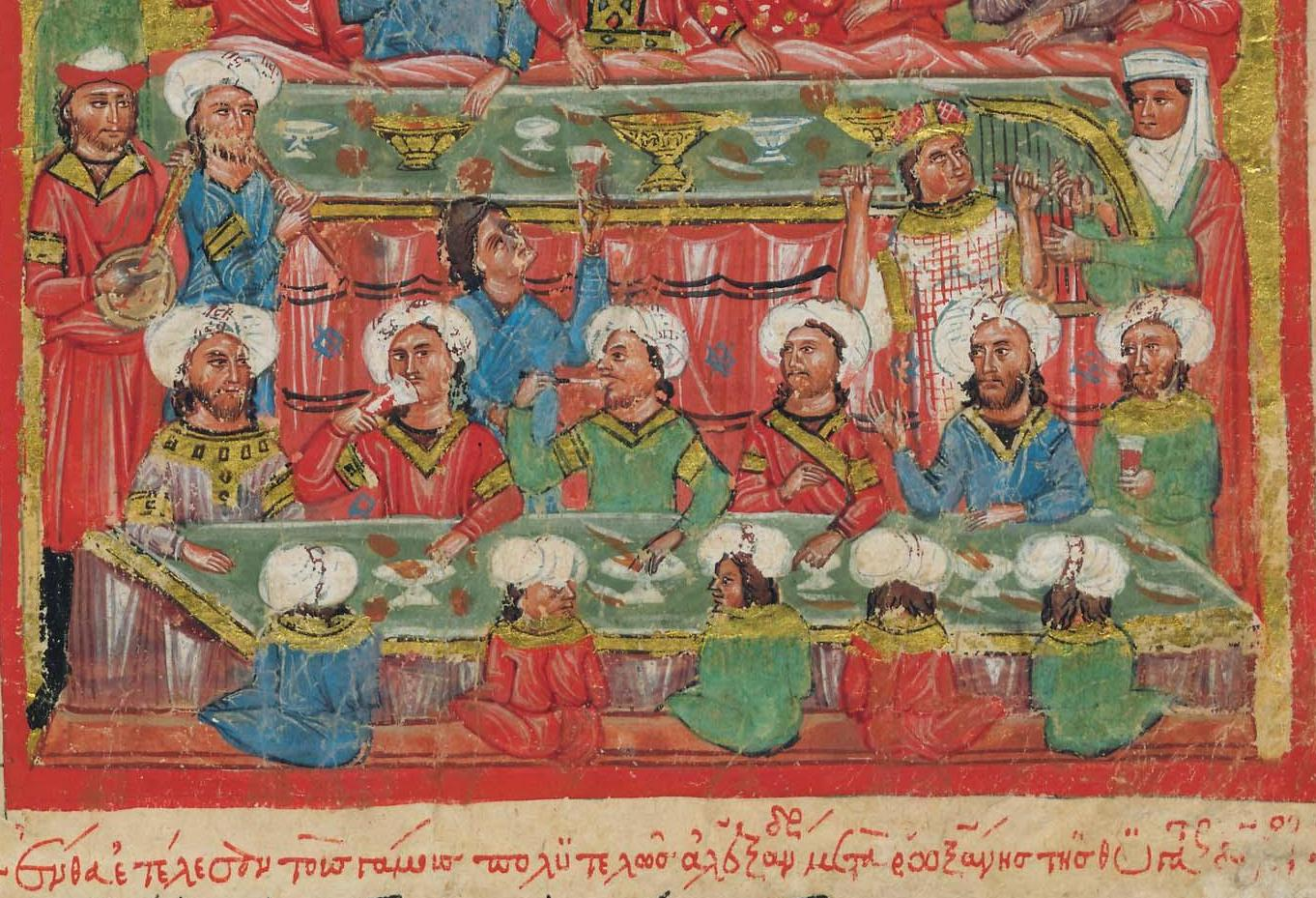
Late 14th century, Byzantine Empire. Arched harp and other instruments played at a banquet (illustrating scene from the Trebizond Alexander Romance).

== Examples of angular harps ==
- Çeng
- Chang (instrument)
- Konghou
