= Jawad Sharif =

Pakistani filmmaker, producer, activist

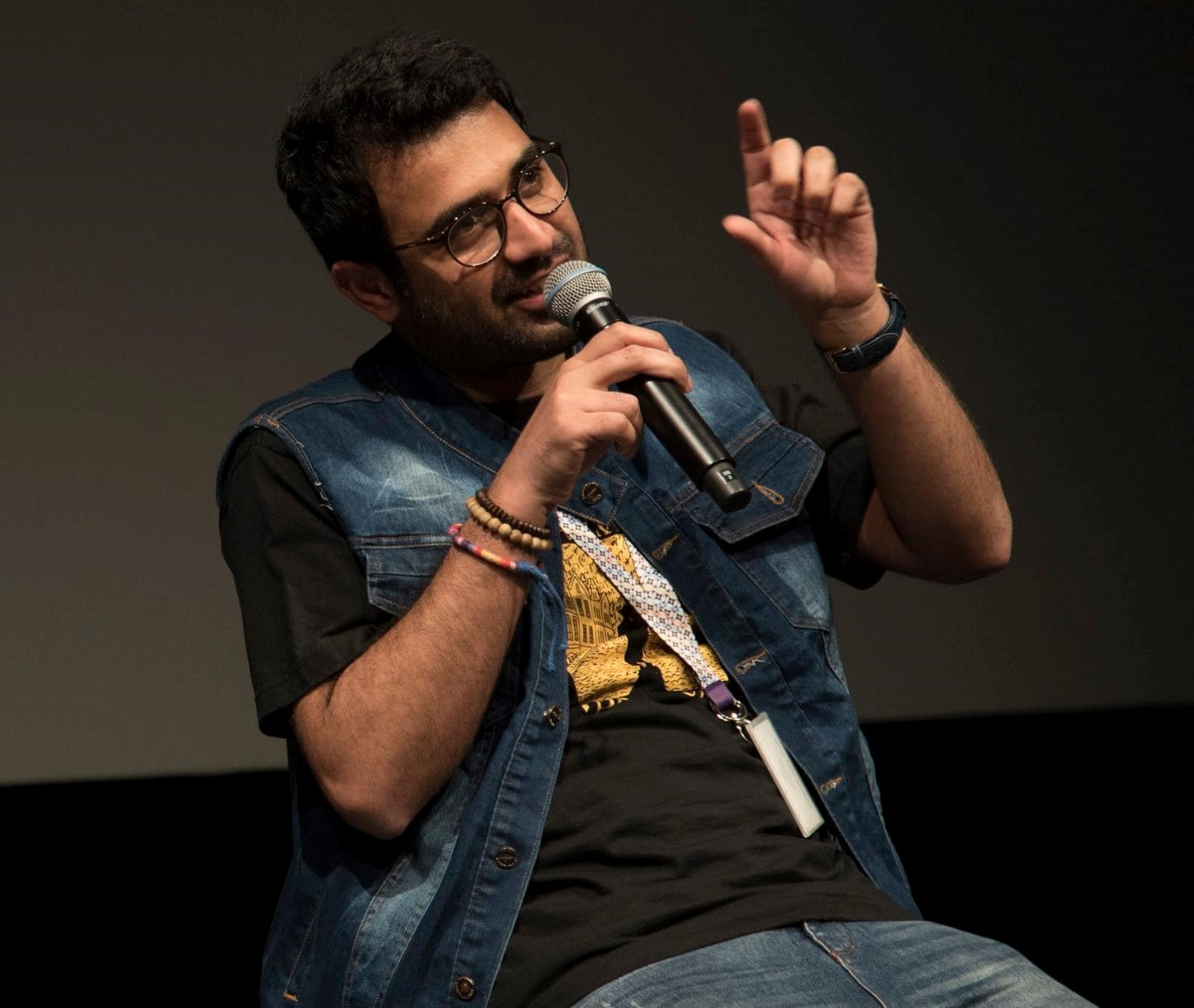
- Jawad Sharif at Dubai Film Festival, 2020
- Born: Rawalpindi, Pakistan
- Occupations: Filmmaker; producer; activist
- Years active: 2006-present
- Known for: Indus Blues
- Website: jawadshariffilms.com

Jawad Sharif is a Pakistani filmmaker, producer, and activist, who directed the documentary film Indus Blues (2018). The film won the Grand Jury Prize at the Guam International Film Festival in the United States. At the 11th Jaipur International Film Festival, it was declared the Best Documentary Feature and also bagged the award for Best Cinematography. He is also the producer, cinematographer, and editor of the award-winning documentary film K2 & the Invisible Footmen (2015). The film has won over 37 awards in several categories.

Sharif was born in Rawalpindi. He was awarded a scholarship at UCLA School of Theater, Film and Television in 2016. He is a TED fellow and represented Pakistan as a filmmaker in Vancouver, Canada in 2022 for a TED talk. He received the HBL PSL Hamaray Heroes Award, 2022.

Sharif also directed Natari (2021), The Color of Smog (2022), and Beyond the Heights (2015). Natari was part of the official selection of the Climate Crisis Film Festival 2021, which was held in line with the COP26 in Glasgow, UK.

Jawad Sharif is a National Geographic Explorer. In February 2024 he also attended the annual National Geographic Storytellers Summit which was held in Los Angeles, California.

== Early life ==
Jawad Sharif was born in Rawalpindi, Pakistan. He completed his degree in computer science before venturing into filmmaking. He started his career as a commercial television director and transitioned to documentary filmmaking in 2012. He went to UCLA School of Theater, Film and Television in 2016.

== Career and international recognition ==
He directed the documentary film Beyond the Heights (2015) which is about a young Pakistani Mountaineer Samina Baig. She is the first ever Pakistani woman to climb Mount Everest at the age of 22.

He is also the producer, cinematographer, and editor of the feature documentary K2 and the Invisible Footmen (2015). The film is about the lives and efforts of Pakistani porters, who for decades have facilitated mountaineers from around the world to the ascent of K2, the second-highest mountain in the world. The film is dedicated to Amir Mehdi, the high-altitude porter who lost his toes to frostbite in the first ascent to K2 in 1954. The film won the Best Cinematography and Best Sound and Editing Award at Jaipur International Film Festival, in 2016.

Sharif produced and directed Indus Blues in 2018. It is a feature documentary film that captures the plight of folk artists and their struggles to keep the fading art forms and the dying indigenous musical instruments alive. The film features 11 endangered musical instruments and their craftsmen from across Pakistan. Artists in the film include Nighat Chaudhry, Saif Samejo of The Sketches, Mai Dhai, and Arieb Azhar, who is also the creative producer of the film. Indus Blues won several national and international awards and has brought the artists and their instruments into the mainstream through its screenings around the world.

In 2019, he founded his film production company Jawad Sharif Films. He has directed and produced the documentary film Natari (2021) which revolves around the issue of climate migration in the shrinking Kharo Chan Island in the Indus Delta.

In 2021, he directed The Color of Smog (2021) which raises awareness about the issue of smog in Lahore. In the film, sixteen artists came together to exhibit and talk about their art and the impact of smog on it. The film was preceded by an exhibition titled The Smog Show.

The Losing Side (2022) directed by Jawad Sharif won the Best Human Rights Films Award at the Cannes World Film Festival in December 2022. The Losing Side is about four women whose lives take an unexpected turn when they are forced to convert and marry against their will. The narrative explores themes of resilience and the fight for justice.

Bhashaili (2023), a film by Jawad Sharif, was screened in May 2023 at the Indus Valley School of Art and Architecture (IVS). The film explores the challenges of Pakistani Bengalis facing citizenship and statelessness issues. The film was part of the exhibition Kaghazi Kashtiyan: The Pakistani Bengali Story.

== Awards and nominations ==
Year	Award	Category	Work	Result
2015	Pakistan International Mountain Film Festival	Audience Award	K2 & the Invisible Footmen	Won
2015	BBVA Mountain Film Festival	Jury Prize	K2 & the Invisible Footmen	Won
2015	Rio Mountain Festival	Best Film	K2 & the Invisible Footmen	Won
2015	Salento International Film Festival	Best Documentary	K2 & the Invisible Footmen	Won
2016	Jaipur International Film Festival	Best Cinematography Award and Best Sound & Editing Award	K2 & the Invisible Footmen	Won
2016	Pakistan Calling Film Festival	Best International Film	K2 & the Invisible Footmen	Won
2018	Guam International Film Festival	Crystal Award Best Feature Documentary	Indus Blues	Won
2018	Spotlight Documentary Film Awards	Gold Award	Indus Blues	Won
2018	Top Indie Awards	Best Documentary	Indus Blues	Won
2018	Regina Film Festival	Best Documentary Feature	Indus Blues	Nominated
2018	South Film & Arts Academy Festival	Best Documentary Feature	Indus Blues	Won
2019	Jaipur International Film Festival	Best Feature Documentary & Best Cinematography Award	Indus Blues	Won
2025	Jackson Wild Media Awards	Global Voices	Moklani - The Last Mohanas	Won
2025	Tulum World Environment Film Festival	Best Feature	Natari	Won

== Achievements ==
- Alumnus of Swedish Institute and Institut Fur Auslandsbeziehunge, Germany
- Jury of the Jaipur Library Academy Awards, India
