= Indus Blues =

2018 Pakistani documentary film

- Directed by: Jawad Sharif
- Written by: Haroon Riaz
- Produced by: Jawad Sharif; Zeejah Fazli; Arieb Azhar; Adeel Malik; Mohsin Reza Naqvi
- Starring: Mai Dhai; Krishan Laal Bheel; Faqir Zulfiqar; Ejaz Sarhadi; Sachu Khan; Zohaib Hassan; Ustad Ziauddin
- Cinematography: Asmat Bashir
- Edited by: Jawad Sharif; Asmat Bashir
- Music by: Varqa; Agha Ibrahim Akram
- Release date: August 2018 (Regina)
- Running time: 76 minutes
- Country: Pakistan
- Languages: Urdu; English

Indus Blues is a 2018 Pakistani documentary film produced and directed by filmmaker Jawad Sharif. The film is about the dying folk and classical musical instruments of Pakistan and the struggle of musicians and craftsmen to keep their art alive. The film was premiered in August 2018 at Regina International Film Festival in Canada and nominated for the Best International Documentary Film Award. The official trailer was released in October 2018 in Pakistan.

The film has won several awards in the international film festival circuit including the Grand Jury Prize for the Crystal Award at Guam International Film Festival 2018 and the Best Documentary Feature and Best Cinematography Awards at the Jaipur International Film Festival. The film was selected for the CPH:DOX Documentary Film Festival 2019, Denmark

== Synopsis ==
The film starts with a showcase of classical folk music as it travels in Pakistan from Moenjodaro to the Makran Coast. The soundtrack for this part of the film includes instruments such as Boreendo, Alghoza, and Banjo. Moving to Sui, Baluchistan for Suroz, Cholistan for Raanti, Gilgit-Baltistan for Chardha, Peshawar in Khyber Pakhtunkhwa for Sarinda, and finally to Lahore for Sarangi.

The cast of the film consists of the musicians and craftsmen narrating the sorry state of affairs and surviving in a society that is intolerant to their art and craft. They recount their experiences and the treatment they receive from people around them, reminding them that they are social outcasts who are looked down upon. They reveal that religious bigotry plays a major role in marginalizing them which has resulted in the lack of patronage and economic problems for these artists. Owing to these factors the fate of the last custodians of the art and the future of the indigenous musical instruments and their craftsmen in Pakistan remains in peril.

== Cast ==
Mai Dhai - Folk Artist
Krishan Laal Bheel – Folk Artist
Faqir Zulifiqar – Boreendo Player Artist & Musician
Ejaz Sarhadi – Sarinda Player
Sachu Khan – Suroz Player
Zohaib Hassan – Sarangi Player
Sattar Jogi – Murli Been Player
Mumtaz Ali Sabzal – Banjo Player
Gulbaz Karim – Chardha Player
Akbar Khan Khamisu – Alghoza Player
Ustad Ziauddin – Sarangi Craftsman
Ibrahim Hajano – Alghoza Craftsman
Muhammad Jan – Suroz Craftsman
Shafqat Karim – Chardha Craftsman
Nighat Chaudhary – Classical Dancer
Saif Samejo – Folk & Sufi Artist
Arieb Azhar – Folk & Sufi Artist
Faqeer Juman Shah – Folk & Sufi Artist

== Production ==
The film took four years to complete with only the post-production taking up to two years and was shot across Pakistan from Gilgit-Baltistan to Sindh and the Makran Coast. Jawad Sharif also has stated that "Independent cinema will send the message that our TV Dramas could not."

== Reception ==
Omair Ali wrote for Wire.in that "As much as the documentary shows the joy that the music brings, it is situated in the bleak atmosphere of a conflict-ridden society, where the musicians are forced to talk of their relatives wounded by mortar shelling, or confronted by villagers accusing them of immoral practices. The pleasure of music, of older, generous traditions is – in the documentary – a small pool of cool water in an increasingly thirsty land."

Dr.Nazir Mehmood wrote in the Daily News about the film:"Now ‘Indus Blues’ has taken up the challenge to document near-extinct music and musicians. This is groundbreaking in the sense that, prior to this movie, no other director or producers had ever attempted to highlight the issues faced by our folk musicians and instrument-makers, and how they are trying to keep their art and craft alive."

== Awards and nominations ==
Year	Award	Category	Result
2018	Guam International Film Festival	Crystal Award Best Feature Documentary	Won
2018	Spotlight Documentary Film Awards	Gold Award	Won
2018	South Film and Arts Academy Festival	Best Documentary Feature	Won
2018	Regina International Film Festival	Best Documentary Feature	Nominated
2018	Top Indie Film Awards	Best Documentary Feature	Won
2019	Mind the Indie Film Festival	Best Documentary Feature	Won
2019	Jaipur International Film Festival	Best Documentary Feature and Best Cinematography Award	Won
