= Dastkari (album) =

Studio album by The Sketches
- Released: February 5, 2010
- Recorded: March 2008 – February 2009
- Genre: Folk, pop/rock
- Length: 55:51
- Label: Fire Records
- Producer: The Sketches

Singles from Dastkari
- 1. "Maujood" Released: November 2009; 2. "Bhool Chukay" Released: February 2010; 3. "Dastkari" Released: May 2010; 4. "Kaanton ki Deewarain" Released: July 2010; 5. "Raat" Released: December 2010

Dastkari is the debut album by Pakistani band Sufi/Folk/Rock band The Sketches, released on February 5, 2010.

== Track listing ==
1. "Kanton Ki Dewareen"
2. "Moujood"
3. "Justjoo"
4. "Doobti Aankhen"
5. "Dastkari"
6. "Ik Insan"
7. "Subah"
8. "Bhool Chukay"
9. "Kabhi"
10. "Tanhiyoon Main"
11. "Haq Moujood"
12. "Raat"

== Personnel ==
The Sketches

- Saif Samejo - lead vocals

== Other albums ==
A new song Jogi and album YOUwas launched.
