= Meena (song) =

Single by Saif Samejo

from the album Meena
- Released: April 16, 2014
- Recorded: 2014
- Studio: Lahooti Records
- Genre: Pop; Pakistani
- Length: 4:46
- Label: The Sketches
- Songwriter(s): Ishaq Samejo
- Producer(s): Saif Samejo

Saif Samejo singles chronology
"Main Sufi Hun" (2013)	"Meena" (2014)

Music video
- "Meena" on YouTube

"Meena" (Sindhi: مینا ; lit. Light) is a 2014 Sindhi language single by Pakistani sufi rock band The Sketches. It was released on April 16, 2014 in Pakistan as a digital download. It is an educational-inspired song about the journey of a girl with her doll (Meena) to the school. It deals with the social issue of education in Sindh. The song was written by Ishaq Samejo, and produced and composed by Saif Samejo.

"Meena" was well received by critics, becoming one of the most successful singles by the band. At the 3rd Annual Hum Awards ceremony, it was nominated for Best Music Single for Saif Samejo and Best Music Video for Haroon and Ghafar.

== About the song ==
The song was produced and composed by Saif himself while the lyrics were written by his brother Ishaq. It is a collaboration between the band's long term partner and musician Frank Arkwright. Describing their inspiration behind the song, Saif said: "The Basic Theme for video is inspired from a short film Silent Wish of Najeeb Rashidi as well as Meena is inspiration from many musicians and artists who have been escalating their word out for education and many those i have been listening since long. Recording Meena also enlarged the kid residing in me. The concern for education could not have been addressed any better than in language of child who is curious to learn and explore. Let's spread the word of education with the aroma of Music in the air. The song is a dedication by Band to those who struggled for education." In an interview, Saif said, "The song will be a dedication to all those who long to be educated yet are deprived of it – We hope the Syllabus will cease to promote inequality, injustice, hatred and exploitation and we hope our educational institutes will promote love peace and harmony, ...May better sense prevails."

== Music video ==
=== Synopsis ===
The video depicts a child's journey between dreams and reality and the seriousness of the problem that hits home. A singer croons in the backdrop of the scenes singing the song, while a little girl starts her journey towards school by carrying a doll named "Meena". On the way, she crosses various hurdles and changes her path while cherishing her enthusiasm and passion for education, but when she reaches the school and opens the door she find nothing but devastation and disintegration. However, the child grows up to be a teacher in the same school, teaching other little girls.

=== Cast and crew ===
Following is the list of artists who worked on this record:

- Singer: Saif Samejo
- Band: The Sketches
- Featuring artist: Arzu, Quratunain, Anoushey and Saif Samejo
- Lyricist: Ishaq Samejo
- Music video director: Haroon Habib and Ghafar Mohihudin
- Record producers: Saif Samejo and The Sketches
- Record label: Lahooti Studios (Jamshoro)

Personnel

- Composer: Saif Samejo
- Mastering engineer: Jono Manson
- Guitarist: Omarn Shafique
- Arrangement: Nomi Ali

== Track listing ==
- Digital download (2014)

"Meena" featuring Saif Samejo — 4:46

== Accolades ==
The single received the following nominations at 2015 Hum Awards:

Year	Award	Category	Recipient(s)	Result
2015	3rd Hum Awards	Best Music Single	The Sketches	Won
2015	3rd Hum Awards	Best Music Video	Haroon Habib, Ghafar	

== See also ==
- "Shikva" by Faakhir
- "Roiyaan" by Farhan Saeed
