= Mirza Ali Baig =

Pakistani mountain climber

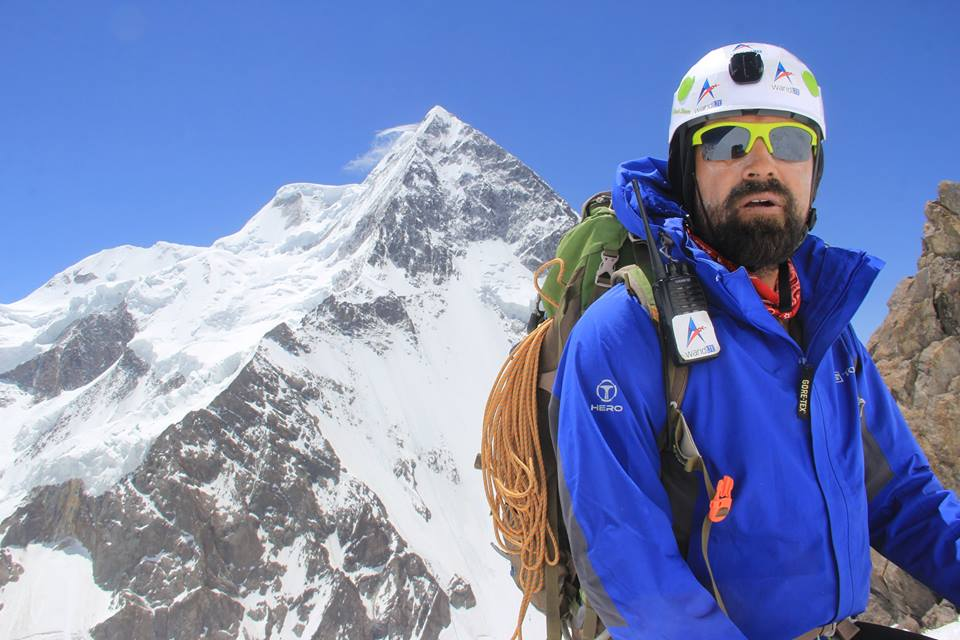
- Born: Mirza Ali Beg; 10 July 1983 (age 43); Shimshal, Gilgit-Baltistan, Pakistan
- Occupations: Mountaineer, photographer, social worker
- Spouse: Samiya Rafiq (m. 2017)
- Relatives: Samina Baig (sister)

Mirza Ali Baig (born 10 July 1983) is a Pakistani mountaineer. He is the first Pakistani man to summit all seven highest peaks in seven continents.

== 7 Summits 7 Continents ==
After Everest expedition for Gender equality and women empowerment, he created yet another project 7 Summits 7 Continents. For Adventure diplomacy, connecting people through Mountains, thus Mirza could bring 5 embassies together to be support group as "Adventure Diplomacy Support Group" Mirza Ali went on this Diplomacy expedition with his sister to conquer the 7 highest peaks in 7 continents and within eight months Samina Baig conquered all 7 Mountains while Mount Everest remained to be conquered by Mirza Ali. He later conquered Mount Everest in 2019 and they became the first Pakistani siblings to complete the Seven Summits.

== Beyond The Heights ==
Beyond the Heights is a documentary about Samina Baig's journey from her remote mountain village to the top of Mount Everest. It was premiered on 5 March 2015 in Islamabad and was released on limited screens around Pakistan.

== National Youth Skiing Camp ==
In January 2015 first ever National Youth Skiing Camp was organized by Mirza Ali with the strong support from Stephen Keck and Andreas Ehrensberger from Austria. Around 33 participants from various parts of Pakistan came to the ski camp.

== List of Mountains climbed ==
| Name of Peak | Name of Group | Year |
|---|---|---|
| Samina Peak (6400m) | Pakistan Youth Outreach / SatwaGuna | 2010 |
| Mingli Sar(6050m) | Pakistan Youth Outreach 1st Pakistan Woman Winter Expedition | 2010 |
| Koh-i-brobar (6008m) | Pakistan Youth Outreach | 2011 |
| Mont Blanc (4805m) | Pakistan Youth Outreach | 2012 |
| Mount Aconcagua (6961m) | Pakistan Youth Outreach / 7 Summits 7 Continents | 20 December 2013 |
| Mount Vinson (4892m) | Pakistan Youth Outreach / 7 Summits 7 Continents | 10 January 2014 |
| Mount Kilimanjaro (5895m) | Pakistan Youth Outreach / 7 Summits 7 Continents | 15 February 2014 |
| Carstensz Pyramid (4884m) | Pakistan Youth Outreach / 7 Summits 7 Continents | 25 March 2014 |
| Denali (6190m) | Pakistan Youth Outreach / 7 Summits 7 Continents | 3 July 2014 |
| Mount Elbrus (5642m) | Pakistan Youth Outreach / 7 Summits 7 Continents | 24 July 2014 |
| Mount Everest (8848m) | – | 22 May 2019 |
| Kangchenjunga (8586m) | – | 25 May 2022 |
| K2 (8611m) | – | 31 July 2023 |
