= Blended 328 =

Brother Gabe's House (Formally Blended 328)
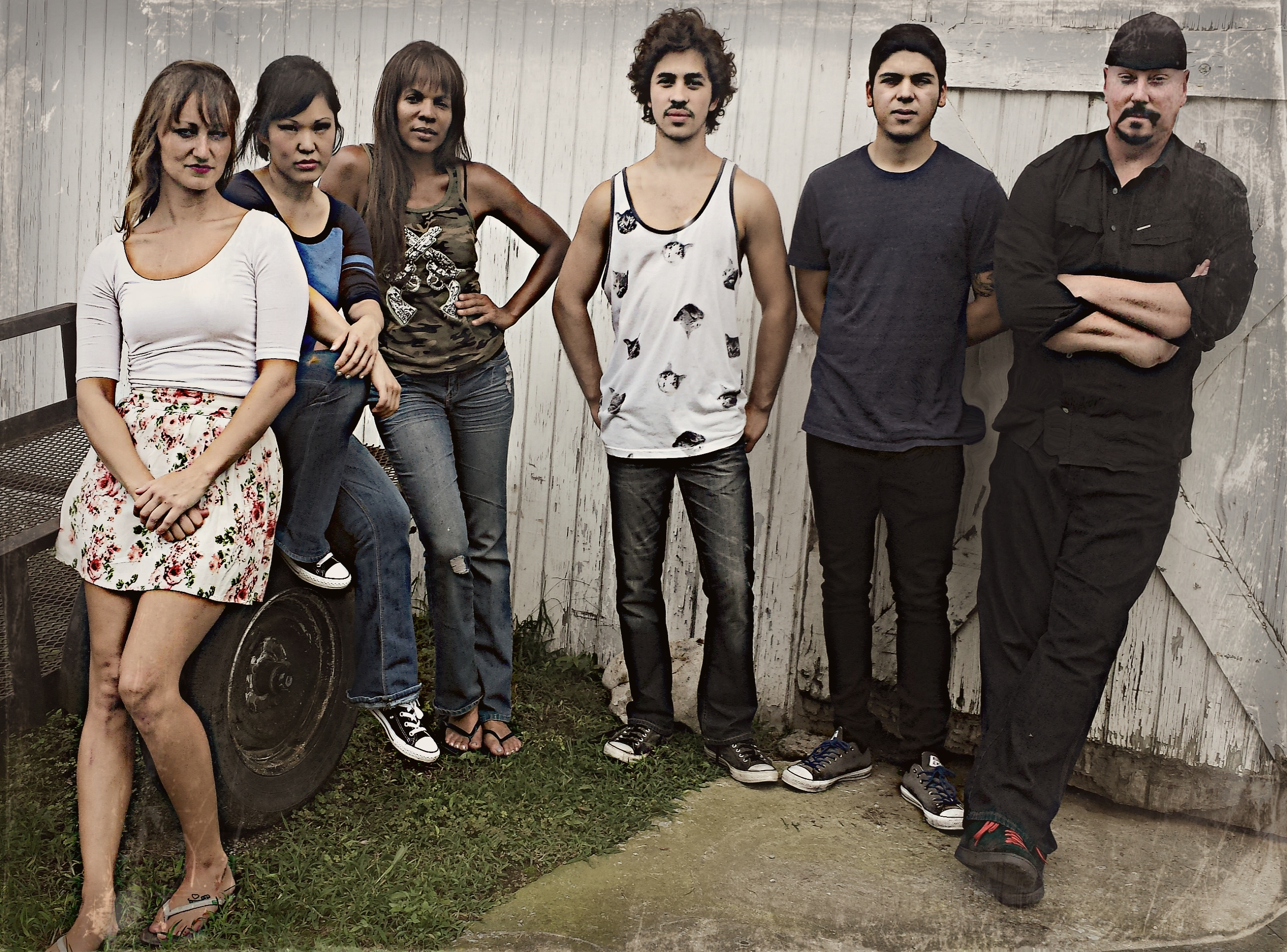

Background information
- Also known as: 328, B-328
- Origin: Nashville, Tennessee, U.S.
- Genres: Country, Pop, Rock
- Years active: 2012–present
- Members: Gabor Miklossy, Kimberly Phillips, Dallas Brown, Be Ke Love, Diego Estrada, Corban Calhoun
- Website: www.brothergabe.us

Brother Gabe's House formally Blended 328 is an American Country Pop group consisting of Kimberly Phillips (vocals), Dallas Brown (vocals), Be Ke Love (vocals), Diego Estrada (drums), Corban Calhoun (guitar) and Gabor Miklossy (bass).

== History ==
Brother Gabe's House (formally Blended 328), was formed through the collaboration of Nashville musicians Be Ke Love and Gabor Miklossy. In January 2012 the band was named "What's Hot for 2012" by Campus Activities Magazine and began touring the college and festival markets in The US, South America, Asia and Africa. The group was selected as a showcase performer at several conferences for the National Association for Campus Activities and the Association for the Promotion of Campus Activities. In July 2012, the band released its debut album "Go People" on indie label, South Jam Nashville. Initial reviews were favorable.

In 2013, the band began its "Country Music for the World" tour with stops in Russia, Thailand, Cambodia, Zimbabwe, Tajikistan, Kazakhstan, Brazil, Paraguay and Pakistan. The group recruited Rick Ross producer (Messy) David Mescon, for tour support, guitars and background vocals. During the two-year tour, Blended 328 co-headlined several international music festivals including HIFA 2014 in Zimbabwe, The 2013 Usadba Jazz Festival in Russia and The 2014 Santa Lucia Festival in Mexico In Pakistan, Blended 328 shared the stage with Pakistani artists Overload, Sketches and others. The band's Pakistani tour included the cities of Karachi, Lahore and Islamabad with a final performance in Kashmir. The band also signed with Franklin booking agency One World Country Girl Global in 2013. Ticket sales exceeded expectations. The group is also the subject of Crazy Dream, a new documentary series about the band's work as United Nations sustainable development ambassadors. The series is produced by Rainlake Productions (VH1 News Presents: Religion: A Pop Culture History) and award-winning documentary filmmaker Joe Berlinger (Oprah's Master Class, Metallica: Some Kind of Monster, and the Sundance series Iconoclasts).
