= Samiya Rafiq =

Pakistani elite trekker (born 1988)

Samiya Mirza
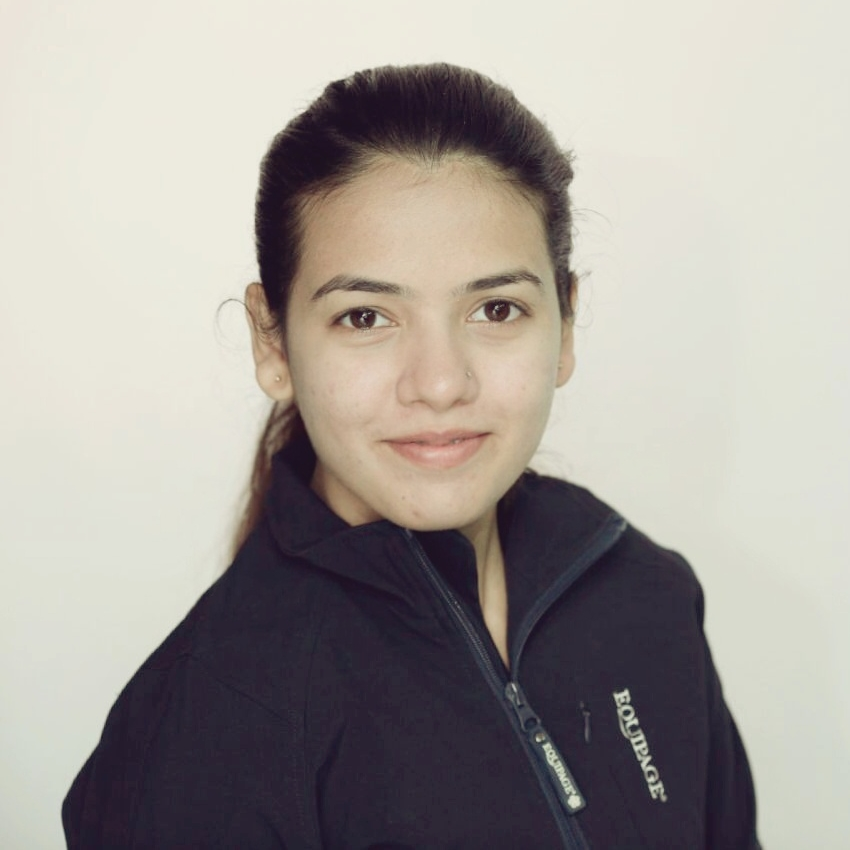
- Born: 17 January 1988 (age 38); Riyadh, Saudi Arabia
- Education: Institute of Business Administration, Karachi alumnus
- Occupations: Runner cum Trekker, Entrepreneur, Social Worker
- Relatives: Samina Baig (sister in law)

Samiya Mirza (born Safiya Rafiq, 17 January 1988) is a Pakistani elite trekker. She is the first female elite trekker to attempt Khurdupin pass, the highest pass of the Karakoram range, in the winter of 2016.

== Climbing career ==
Samiya began her climbing activity in the Northern Pakistan. In 2016, she attempted to ascent an unclimbed peak (6,200 m (20,300 ft)) in the vicinity of Khurodpin pass. She and Qudrat Ali pushed on up through the pass, which is the highest pass in the Karakorum mountain range at 5,790 m (19,000 ft). The expedition began on 24 December 2016, and concluded on 6 January 2017.

In 2017, she was an organiser of the High Altitude Marathon Khunjerab Pass on 24 May.

== Early life ==
Samiya Rafiq was born in Saudi Arabia but her origins are from Karachi, Pakistan. She graduated with a degree from Institute of Business Administration, Karachi.
