= The Turkish harpist (Manuchehri) =

11th-century poem by Manuchehri

Manuchehri's Turkish harpist is a poem by the 11th-century Persian royal court poet Manuchehri. It is also known as Dar madh-e Espahbad Manūchehr ebn-e Qābūs (در مدح اسپهبد منوچهر ابن قابوس) "In praise of the Espahbad Manuchehr son of Qabus", or Qasida No. 39 in the collected works (Diwān) of Manuchehri.

The poem is a qasīda (praise poem, ode) in the Arabic style, consisting of 30 or 31 verses, all with the same rhyme. The first ten lines praise the beauty and skill of a harpist who is playing at the autumn festival of Mehrgan. Lines 11–16 describe the fierceness and warlike qualities of Manuchehr, to whom the poem is addressed; and lines 17–23 describe the ruler's splendid war horse. The poet goes on to encourage Manuchehr to enjoy the feast and ends with a prayer that his career will continue to be successful and glorious.

The poem is notable for its musical rhymes, such as čang čang ... sang sang ... tang tang, which imitate the thrumming of the harp (chang) and play on different meanings of the words. As with many of Manuchehri's poems, he expresses his delight in the feast and the joys of life.

== Historical background ==
Manuchehri's patron, after whom he took his pen-name Manuchehri, Manuchehr son of Qabus, was ruler of the region of Tabaristan, also known as Mazandaran, on the south side of the Caspian Sea. Manuchehr was not completely independent, but was a vassal of Sultan Mahmud of Ghazni (d. 1030). The title Espahbad or Espahbod was given to an army commander or minor ruler not directly appointed by the Sultan, but who was a vassal like Manuchehr or his father. The title goes back to pre-Islamic times.

Manuchehr died c. 1030, so the poem was evidently written therefore before this date. Sometime after Manuchehr's death, Manuchehri migrated to Ghazni (in present-day Afghanistan) where he became a court poet to Mahmud's son, Masʽud I.

The poem was written to celebrate Mehrgān (also pronounced Mehregān or Mehragān), an autumn festival dating back to pre-Islamic times which is held 195 days after the spring festival of Nowruz.

== Sex of the harpist ==
The sex of the harpist is not completely clear. Although harpists were often illustrated as female, yet the instrument was also played by men: both Rudaki and Manuchehri's contemporary Farrokhi are said to have been excellent harpists. It was possible for the same person to be both a soldier and to play the harp, as this verse of Farrokhi, in another qasida using the rhyme -ang and playing on the two meanings of čang, makes clear:

برکش ای تُرک و بیکسو فکن این جامه جنگ
چنگ برگیر و بنه درقه و شمشیر از چنگ

bar-kaš ey Tork o be yek sū fekan īn jāme-ye jang
čang bar-gīr o beneh darqe (w)o šamšīr az čang

Take off, o Turk, and throw aside these clothes of war!
Pick up the harp (čang) and put down the shield and sword from your hand (čang)!

Both Kazimirski and the author of EIr (2004) translate Manuchehri's poem as if the harpist is male, and this also accords with the Arabic masculine adjective ma'šūq "beloved" used in verse 4, as opposed to the feminine ma'šūqe.

== The poem ==
The first ten verses of the poem are shown below. The transcription shows the modern Iranian pronunciation. The letter x is used for kh (as in Khayyam), q for both qeyn and ghāf; " ' " is a glottal stop.

The metre of the poem is known as ramal; in Elwell-Sutton's classification 2.4.15 (see Persian metres). In most lines there is a break or caesura after the 7th syllable, but in some lines the break is after the 8th or 6th. The pattern is as follows (– = long syllable, u = short syllable):

– u – – – u – – – u – – – u –

Overlong syllables (which take up the position of long plus a short in the metrical pattern) are underlined.

1
بینی آن ترکی که او چون برزند بر چنگ، چنگ
از دل ابدال بگریزد به صد فرسنگ، سنگ

bīni ān Tork-ī ke ū čūn bar-zanad bar čang čang
az del-ē abdāl bogrīzad be sad farsang sang

Do you see that Turk who, when he strikes his hand (čang) on the harp (čang)
the stone (which lies on) the heart of devotees flees for a hundred leagues?

2
بگسلد بر اسب عشق عاشقان بر تنگ صبر
چون کشد بر اسب خویش از موی اسب او تنگ تنگ

bogselad bar asb-e 'ešq-ē 'āšeqān bartang-e sabr
čūn kešad bar asb-e xīš az mūy-e asb ū tang tang

He breaks on his lovers' horse of love the over-strap of patience
whenever he pulls, on his own horse, the strap of horsehair tight.

3
چنگ او در چنگ او همچون خمیده عاشقی
با خروش و با نفیر و با غریو و با غرنگ

čang-e ū dar čang-e ū hamčūn xamīdē 'āšeq-ī
bā xorūš ō bā nafīr ō bā qerīv ō bā qarang

His harp in his hand is just like a bent lover,
with crying and wailing and groaning and sobbing.

4
عاشقی کو بر میان خویش بر بسته‌ست جان
از سر زلفین معشوقش کمر بسته‌ست تنگ

'āšeq-ī k-ū bar miyān-ē xīš bar-basta-st jān
az sar-ē zolfīn-e ma'šūq-aš kamar basta-st tang

A lover who has bound up his soul on his flanks;
and has bound his load tight from the curly-haired head of his beloved.

5
زنگیی گویی بزد در چنگ او در چنگ خویش
هر دو دست خویش ببریده بر او مانند چنگ

zangi-yī gū'ī bezad dar čang-e ū dar čang-e xīš
har do dast-ē xīš bobrīdē bar ū mānand-e čang

As if an Ethiopian has placed his hand in his hand
and has cut off both of his own hands for him like a cripple.(?)

6
وان سر انگشتان او را بر بریشمهای او
جنبشی بس بلعجب و آمد شدی بس بی‌درنگ

v-ān sar-angoštān-e ū rā bar berīšemhā-ye ū
jonbeš-ī bas bo-l-'ajab v-āmad-šodī bas bī-derang

And those finger tips of his on his silk threads
have a very amazing shaking and a very rapid to-ing and fro-ing.

7
بین که دیباباف رومی در میان کارگاه
دیبهی دارد به کار اندر، به رنگ بادرنگ

bīn ke dībā-bāf-e Rūmī dar miyān-ē kār-gāh
dībah-ī dārad be kār andar, be rang-ē bādrang

He is like a Greek silk-weaver in the midst of his workshop
in the midst of making a brocade the colour of oranges.

8
بر سماع چنگ او باید نبید خام خورد
می‌خوش آید خاصه اندرمهرگان بر بانگ چنگ

bar samā'-ē čang-e ū bāyad nabīd-ē xām xord
mey xoš āyad xāse andar Mehrgān bar bāng-e čang

When listening to his harp one must drink new wine;
wine is delicious especially at Mehrgan with the music of the harp.

9
خوش بود بر هر سماعی می، ولیکن مهرگان
بر سماع چنگ خوشتر بادهٔ روشن چو زنگ

xoš bovad bar har samā'-ī mey valīken Mehrgān
bar samā'-ē čang xoštar bāde-yē rowšan čo zang

Wine is delicious at any concert, but at Mehrgan
at a concert of a harp, even more delicious is wine shining like the rays of the sun.

10
مهرگان جشن فریدونست و او را حرمتست
آذری نو باید و می خوردنی بی‌آذرنگ

Mehrgān jašn-ē Fereydūn ast o ū rā hormat ast
Āzar-ī now bāyad ō mey xordan-ī bī āzrang

Mehrgan is the festival of Fereidun, and honours him.
A new Azar is needed and a drinking of wine without sorrow.

== Notes on individual verses ==
=== Verse 1 ===
The word čang has several meanings: (1) a harp; (2) a hand with fingers bent; (3) anything crooked or bent; (4) the talon of a bird or claws of a wild animal; (5) a person crippled in hand or foot.

Kazimirski translates sang (literally, a stone) as "the stone which weighs on the heart" and "the burden of his griefs (le fardeau de ses chagrins)". The author of EIr (2004) translates it as "self-restraint".

A farsang, which Ancient Greek authors called a parasang, is a unit equivalent to the distance travelled in an hour, still used today. In modern times it is defined as a distance of 6 km (about 3.7 miles), but in the past it varied with the terrain. The European equivalent was the league.

=== Verse 2 ===
The word tang also has several meanings. These include (1) narrow, straight, tight; (2) a horse-girth or strap for fastening on a load; (3) half a load (as much as is carried upon one side of an animal).

bartang is the upper strap or over-strap used for tying on a load.

The harp is seen metaphorically as a horse which the player is riding. The strings of a harp were often made of horsehair. "Since harp strings were usually made of horsehair, Manūčehrī likens a harp to a horse “with its head up and its mane down”.

=== Verse 4 ===
It is a frequent metaphor of Persian love poetry that the curly locks (zolf) of the beloved keep the lover in bondage. Boys as well as girls had long locks. E. G. Browne relates a story of how Sultan Mahmud cut off the locks of his favourite slave boy Ayaz when drunk and was in a very bad mood the following day.

=== Verse 5 ===
The meaning of this verse is obscure. Kazimirski suggests that it means that "an Ethiopian (a race known to be constantly joyful) has put his hand in the harpist's and is moving it so rapidly over the instrument that the hands appear to be invisible, as if they have been cut off." However, this is not certain. The word Zangī is the word generally used in Persian poetry for a negro or black man. It is also chosen here for its rhyme with čang.

=== Verse 7 ===
Rūm was the name given to the remnant of the former Roman empire (by this time Greek-speaking) in Asia Minor (modern Turkey), hence Rūmī means "Greek" or from Asia Minor. In the Middle Ages, the brocades woven by Byzantine weavers were famous. (See Brocade#Byzantium.)

Bādrang is a citrus fruit or orange, such as even today commonly grows in Mazandaran Province; it is also a kind of cucumber.

=== Verse 8 ===
Mehregan is a Zoroastrian autumn festival which at this period was celebrated as widely as Now Ruz, but later, after the Mongol invasions (13th century), became less popular. It was particularly associated with the Zoroastrians. At this time the Zoroastrian religion still had many followers in the Caspian Sea provinces.

=== Verse 9 ===
Kazimirski translates rowšan čo rang as "shining like blood". However, "blood" is not one of the meanings given for rang in Steingass's dictionary. Dehkhoda's dictionary quotes this verse as an example of the meaning "rays of the sun".

=== Verse 10 ===
Fereidun was a mythical ancient Iranian king, whose life is described in Ferdowsi's Shahnameh. He is said to have ruled for 500 years.

Azar in the Iranian calendar is the last month of autumn, corresponding to October–November. There is a play of words here between Āzar and āz(a)rang "distress, sorrow, misery".

== See also ==
- Manuchehri
- Chang (instrument)

== Bibliography ==
- Browne, E. G. (1906). A Literary History of Persia. Vol 2, chapter 2, especially pp. 153–156. ISBN 0-7007-0406-X
- Clinton, Jerome W. (1972). The divan of Manūchihrī Dāmghānī; a critical study. (Minneapolis: Bibliotheca Islamica.)
- "EIr" (2004, updated 2012). "Homosexuality in Persian literature". Encyclopaedia Iranica.
- Elwell-Sutton, L. P. (1975)."The Foundations of Persian Prosody and Metrics". Iran, vol 13. (Available on JSTOR).
- Kazimirski, A. de Biberstein (1886). Manoutchehri: Poète persan du 11^{ème} siècle de notre ère (du 5^{ième} de l'hégire): Texte, traduction, notes, et introduction historique. Paris. Klincksieck. (Another copy, dated 1887). This poem is no. XXVIII, with a French translation on pp. 205–6 and notes on pp. 360–362.
- Lawergren, Bo (2003, updated 2012). "Harp". Encyclopaedia Iranica online.
- Mallah, Hosayn-Ali (1990). "Čang". Encyclopaedia Iranica online.
- Rypka, Jan (1967). History of Iranian Literature. Reidel Publishing Company. ASIN B-000-6BXVT-K
