= Manuchehri =

Persian poet

Abu Najm Aḥmad ibn Qauṣ ibn Aḥmad Manūčihrī (Persian: ابونجم احمد ابن قوص ابن احمد منوچهری دامغانی), a.k.a. Manuchehri Dāmghānī (fl. 1031–1040), was an eleventh-century court poet in Persia and in the estimation of J. W. Clinton, 'the third and last (after ʿUnṣurī and Farrukhī) of the major panegyrists of the early Ghaznawid court'. Among his poems is "The Turkish harpist".

== Life ==
According to J. W. Clinton, 'very little is known of his life, and that little is derived exclusively from his poetry. Later tadhkira writers have expanded and distorted this modicum of information with a few, readily refuted speculations'.

Manuchehri's epithet Dāmghānī indicates that he was from Damghan in Iran, and his poetry shows an encyclopaedic familiarity with Arabic and Persian verse which was presumably acquired in youth.

Manuchehri's activities can only be dated and localised via the dedicatees of his praise-poetry. Around a third of his panegyrics are addressed to Masʿūd. Of the rest, most are to major officials of Masʿūd's court. But some poems mention patrons who cannot be identified or who are not named at all.

in 422-24/1031-33, when he composed poems dedicated to deputies of Sultan Masʿūd, who was at that time based at Ray.

At some point following the death of Aḥmad b. Ḥasan Maymandī, vizier to Masʿūd, in 424/1033, Manuchehri made his way to the court of Ghazna, then under Aḥmad ibn ʿAbd al-Ṣamad Shīrazī.

Manuchehri's date of death is unknown, but none of his poems seems to postdate his time in the court of Masʿūd in Ghazna; Masʿūd died in 432/1041, following defeat in battle at Dandanaqan.

== Works ==
Manuchehri left behind a divan containing fifty-seven qaṣīdas . He is said to have invented the form of musammaṭ (stanzaic poems) in Persian poetry and to have written the best examples of this form; eleven survive. He is also known to have composed a few rubāʿīs, ghazals, and other short passages. In the view of J. W. Clinton,

Manūčihrī’s poetry has several qualities which distinguish it from the work of his contemporaries. His enthusiasm for Arabic poetry, expressed in imitations of djāhiliyya style ḳaṣīdas and frequent allusions to Arab poets, was unknown among the Persian-writing poets of his day. Even more distinctive, however, is his delight and great skill in depicting the paradisial beauty of the royal garden at Nawrūz and Mihrgān, and the romantic and convivial scenes associated with them, in the exordium (naṣīb, tashbīb) of the ḳaṣīda. Moreover, he displays a gift for mythic animation in elaborating such concepts as the battle of the seasons (poem 17) and wine as the daughter of the vine (poems 20, 57, 58, 59 and 60). Though it is not unique to him, Manūčihrī’s engaging lyricism is remarked upon by all commentators.

=== A sample of Manuchehri's poetry ===
The following are the opening lines of one of his most famous musammāt, a poem consisting of 35 stanzas of 3 couplets each, with the rhyme scheme aaaaab, cccccb, dddddb etc.:

خیزید و خز آرید که هنگام خزان است
باد خنک از جانب خوارزم وزان است
آن برگ رزان بین که بر آن شاخ رزان است
گویی به مَثَلْ پیرهن رنگرزان است
دهقان به تعجب سرِ انگشت گزان است
کاندر چمن و باغ نه گُل ماند و نه گلنار

xīzīd-o xaz ārīd ke hengām-e xazān ast
bād-ē xonok az jāneb-e Xārazm vazān ast
ān barg-e razān bīn ke bar ān šāx-e razān ast
gū'ī be masal pīrahan-ē rang-razān ast
dehqān be ta'ajjob sar-e-angošt-gazān ast
k-andar čaman-ō bāq na gol mānd o na golnār

Metre:

– – | u u – – | u u – – | u u – – (3.3.14)

Arise and bring fur as autumn is here
A cold wind is blowing from Khwarazm yonder
Look at that vine-leaf which is on that vine-bough!
It looks like the shirt of some dyers
The farmer is biting the tip of his finger with wonder
As in orchard and garden neither rose remains nor pomegranate flower.

There are 35 stanzas, each of three couplets, with the rhyme scheme aaaaax, bbbbbx, cccccx, etc. The poet plays on the similar sounding words: xīz 'rise', xaz 'fur', xazān 'autumn'; razān 'vines' and rang-razān 'dyers'. In addition there is alliteration of x, x, x, x, x (lines 1–2), b, r, b, r (line 3), r, r, r (line 4), and g, g (line 5), and assonance of ā, ā, ā (line 6).

The metre is 3.3.14 in Elwell-Sutton's classification, which is one of the various metres traditionally known as hazaj. It consists of the familiar ionicus a minore rhythm (u u – –), but with the first two syllables missing. (See Persian metres.)

== Influence ==
The British modernist poet Basil Bunting published adaptions of a number of Manuchehri's poems from 1939 onwards, and a little of Manuhehri's sound-patterning seems to have influenced Bunting's English verse.

== Editions and translations ==
- Kazimirski, A. de Biberstein (1886). Manoutchehri: Poète persan du 11^{ème} siècle de notre ère (du 5^{ième} de l'hégire): Texte, traduction, notes, et introduction historique. Paris. Klincksieck. (Another copy, dated 1887).
- Dīwān, ed. Muḥammad Dabīr-Siyāḳī, 3rd edn. Tehran. 1347/1968.

== Bibliography ==
- Browne, E. G. (1906). A Literary History of Persia. Vol 2, chapter 2, especially pp. 153–156. ISBN 0-7007-0406-X
- Clinton, Jerome W. (1972). The divan of Manūchihrī Dāmghānī; a critical study. (Minneapolis: Bibliotheca Islamica.)
- Elwell-Sutton, L. P. (1975)."The Foundations of Persian Prosody and Metrics". Iran, vol 13. (Available on JSTOR).
- Patton, Simon; Azadibougar, Omid (2016). "Basil Bunting's Versions of Manuchehri Damghani". Translation and Literature, Volume 25 Issue 3, Page 339–362, ISSN 0968-1361. (Edinburgh University Press).
- Rypka, Jan History of Iranian Literature. Reidel Publishing Company. ASIN B-000-6BXVT-K
- Tolouei, Azar A. (2004) The Impact of Moallaghat-e-Sab-e on Manuchehri. Journal of the Faculty of Letters and Humanities (Tabriz). Winter 2004, Volume 46, Number 189.

== See also ==
- The Turkish harpist (Manuchehri)
- List of Persian poets and authors
