= Beyond the Heights =

- Theatrical release poster
- Directed by: Jawad Sharif
- Written by: Sohail Parwaz
- Produced by: Mirza Ali Baig
- Starring: Samina Baig; Mirza Ali Baig
- Narrated by: Yasmin Amin Jaswal
- Cinematography: Jawad Sharif
- Edited by: Ibrahim Ajnabi
- Production companies: Karakorum Films; Karakoram Expeditions
- Release date: 5 March 2015
- Running time: 47 minutes
- Country: Pakistan
- Languages: Urdu; English

Beyond the Heights is a 2015 Pakistani documentary film directed by Jawad Sharif, produced and written by Mirza Ali Baig under the banner Bipolar Films. The film is about 21 aged mountaineer Samina Baig who became first Pakistani woman reaching the summit of Mount Everest. The film stars Samina Baig herself accompanied by her brother Mirza Ali Baig who also became the youngest Pakistani man to conquer the Mount Everest at 29. The film is about the struggle of a young woman who overcomes all challenges to accomplish her dream. It gives insight to the life of small town girl who bravely faces all hardships and touches new horizons with strong will power and motivation.

== Release ==
The film was premiered on 5 March 2015 in Islamabad. It was released on limited screens in Pakistan.
