= Coke Studio Pakistan season 4 =

Fourth television season of Coke Studio

Coke Studio Pakistan
- Season 4
- Season 4 Poster
- Starring: Featured Artists
- No. of episodes: 5

Release
- Original network: YouTube
- Original release: May 22 – July 17, 2011

Season chronology
- ← Previous; Season 3 Next → Season 5

The fourth season of the Pakistani music television series Coke Studio Pakistan commenced airing on 22 May 2011 and ended on 17 July 2011.

Rohail Hyatt and his wife Umber Hyatt remained as the producers of the show. The houseband recruited drummer Raheel Manzar Paul and vocalist Rachel Viccaji. The houseband saw Sanam Saeed and Saba Shabbir leaving the band and the rest of the houseband remained unchanged.

== Artists ==
Sanam Marvi made a return to the fourth season of the show performing for the second time at Coke Studio, she first appeared in the previous season. Other featuring artists in the fourth season included, progressive metal band Mizraab, Balouchi folk singer Akhtar Chanal Zahri, pop rock band Jal from Lahore, qawwal group of Fareed Ayaz & Abu Muhammad and eastern classical Punjabi singer Attaullah Khan Esakhelvi.

=== Featured Artists ===
- Akhtar Chanal Zahri
- Asif Hussain Samraat
- Attaullah Khan Esakhelvi
- Bilal Khan
- Fareed Ayaz & Abu Mohammad
- Jal
- Kaavish
- Komal Rizvi
- Mizraab
- Mole
- Qurat-ul-Ain Balouch
- Sajjad Ali
- Sanam Marvi
- Akhtar Chanal Zahri
- The Sketches
- Ustaad Naseer-ud-din Saami

=== Backing Vocals ===
- Rachel Viccaji
- Zoe Viccaji

=== House Band ===
- Asad Ahmed
- Babar Ali Khanna
- Jaffer Ali Zaidi
- Javed Iqbal
- Kamran "Mannu" Zafar
- Louis 'Gumby' Pinto
- Omran "Momo" Shafique
- Raheel Manzar Paul
- Sikander Mufti
- Zulfiq 'Shazee' Ahmed Khan

== Production ==
Speaking at the launch of Coke Studio, Rohail Hyatt said:

"Working on Coke Studio 4 has been a wondrous experience. The process of discovering, deciphering and understanding so many different samples of regional and classical music has been a huge undertaking and the responsibility of then reinterpreting and reinventing the material – repackaging it visually and musically – has been an immense challenge. Coke Studio 4 has been a captivating journey. It has been a portal to discovery, inducing our curiosity and compelling us to dwell on the uniqueness of our heritage with renewed pride and respect. Altogether, CS4 has been a very stimulating and rewarding challenge."

— Rohail Hyatt, Executive Producer Coke Studio

== Episodes ==
No. overall	Song Title	Artist(s)	Lyricist(s)	Language(s)	Original release date
Episode 1
15	"Daanah Pah Daanah"	Akhtar Chanal Zahri & Komal Rizvi	Akhtar Chanal Zahri	Brahui, Balochi, Persian, Punjabi & Urdu	May 19, 2011
15	"Ik Aarzu"	Jal	Goher Mumtaz & Bulleh Shah	Punjabi & Urdu	May 19, 2011
15	"Kuch Hai"	Mizraab	Adnan Ahmed	Urdu	May 19, 2011
15	"Sighṛa Aaween"	Sanam Marvi	Sachal Sarmast & Sultan Bahu	Punjabi & Siraiki	May 19, 2011
15	"To Kia Hua"	Bilal Khan	Bilal Khan	Urdu	May 19, 2011
Episode 2
16	"Kangna"	Fareed Ayaz & Abu Muhammad	Mirza Qateel & Bedam Shah Warsi	Braj & Persian	June 1, 2011
16	"Kirkir Kirkir"	Sajjad Ali	Sajjad Ali	Punjabi	June 1, 2011
16	"Ni Oothan Waale"	Attaullah Khan Esakhelvi	Bari Nizami	Punjabi & Siraiki	June 1, 2011
16	"Nindiya Re"	Kaavish	Jaffer Ali Zaidi	Urdu	June 1, 2011
16	"Senraan Ra Baairya"	Asif Hussain Samraat & Zoe Viccaji	Rajasthani Folk	Marwari	June 1, 2011
Episode 3
17	"Baageshri"	Mole	-	Instrumental	June 17, 2011
17	"Lamha"	Bilal Khan	Bilal Khan	Urdu	June 17, 2011
17	"Ith Naheen"	Sanam Marvi	Sachal Sarmast	Urdu & Siraiki	June 17, 2011
17	"Panchi"	Jal & Quratulain Balouch	Goher Mumtaz	Urdu & Punjabi	June 17, 2011
17	"Mundari"	Ustaad Naseer-ud-Din Saami	Folk	Braj	June 17, 2011
Episode 4
18	"Mandh"	The Sketches	Shah Latif	Sindhi	July 1, 2011
18	"Pyaar Naal"	Attaullah Khan Esakhelvi	Afzal Aajiz	Urdu & Siraiki	July 1, 2011
18	"Nar Bait"	Akhtar Chanal Zahri	Ustaad Ishaq Soz & Sherzaad	Brahui & Balochi	July 1, 2011
18	"Lambi Judaai"	Komal Rizvi	Anand Bakshi	Urdu	July 1, 2011
18	"Rang Laaga"	Sajjad Ali & Sanam Marvi	Amir Khusrau, Ali Moeen & Sajjad Ali	Braj & Punjabi	July 1, 2011
Episode 5
19	"Beero Binjaaro"	Asif Hussain Samraat	Rajasthani Folk	Marwari	July 15, 2011
19	"Mori Bangri"	Fareed Ayaz & Abu Muhammad	Folk	Braj	July 15, 2011
