= Jogi (The Sketches song) =

Sufi Sindhi song by The Sketches band

"Jogi Song" is a song by Pakistani Sufi-rock band The Sketches in which guest appearance have been given by Grammy Award winning harmonica player John Popper and its produced by Jono Manson. The Jogi song is recorded in Pakistan and US. This song is nominated for Best Song in the World Beat category at the New Mexico Music Awards.

"Jogi" was released as the first single from an album by The Sketches.
