= Saif Samejo =

Founder and lead vocalist of the Pakistani band The Sketches

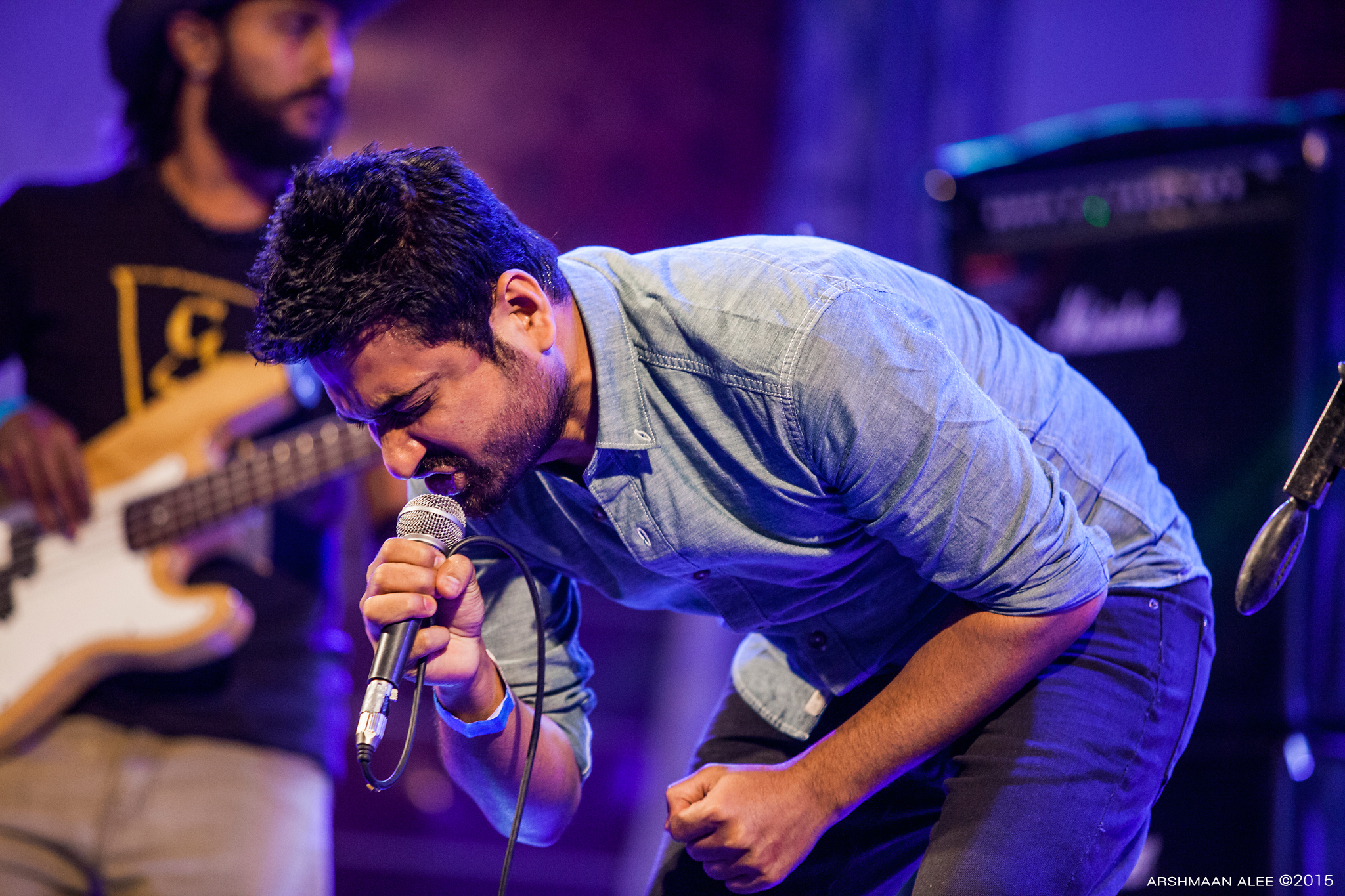
- April 19th, 2015 - Saif Samejo, performing with his band The Sketches at Music Mela, Islamabad.

Background information
- Born: Saif Samejo; 23 January 1984 (age 42); Khairpur, Sindh, Pakistan
- Origin: Jamshoro, Sindh
- Genres: Sufi; Folk; Pop/Rock
- Occupation: Singer
- Instrument: Guitar
- Years active: 2003 – Present
- Labels: Fire Records, Lahooti Records
- Website: www.saifsamejo.com

Saif Samejo (born 23 January 1984) is a musician and founder, lead vocalist and songwriter of the Pakistani Sufi folk band The Sketches. In May 2014 he opened the first music Aashram (School) in Hyderabad, Sindh named as "Lahooti Music Aashram". He composed music for Dastan-e Momal Rano on the show Coke Studio.

== Early life and education ==
Saif Samejo was born on January 23, 1984, in Khairpur, Sindh in a Sindhi Muslim family. He studied bachelors in English Literature at the University of Sindh Jamshoro .

== Music career ==
With a consistency The Sketches climbed up the ladder of success in not just parts of Sindh but the entire Pakistan with popular hits including "Nind Nashe Vich", "Rano", "Raat", "Main Sufi Hoon", and "Meena". Recently a new music album YOU (Sindhi: تون) and a new song Jogi was launched.

Saif collaborated with Mai Dhai to present the original Rajasthani flavor of music besides this he also intended to collaborate with other artist through Lahooti Music Ashram.

=== Lahooti Live Sessions ===
Lahooti Live Sessions launched by Saif Samejo in June 2013, is a weekly activity where different musicians from Sindh gather at Samejo's place to play live music. The audio and video of the performances is recorded and released on social media. Samejo himself is the front man of the Jamshoro-based rock band The Sketches, and the Lahooti Sessions are in the vein of something that he has wanted to do for a long time; cultural preservation in its most unadulterated form. Lahooti live sessions appears as a dream come true for him.

"The aim was not only to record these musicians, but to do so in the highest possible audio-visual quality so that they can be presented in an equally good manner on social media," Samejo adds.

Around 50 different folk musicians have been recorded and released as part of the Lahooti live sessions and most of them have never been exposed to the camera or the recording equipment before. Some prominent names include Mai Dhai, Zulfiqar Fakir, Arieb Azhar, band Bell, two Changg players from Thatta – Ali Mohammad and Feroz Roonjho, Manjhi Faqeer, Talib Talari, Mai Hanjoo and Mohammad Hassan.

=== Lahooti Music Aashram ===
The Lahooti School of music is an extension of the Lahooti Live Sessions that Saif started a year before, with the intent of preserving indigenous instruments and instrumentalists. Lahooti music school named as Lahooti Music Aashram is the first proper music school in Hyderabad/Jamshoro inaugurated in May 2014.

The school offers a thirty-six-hour learning module in keyboards, guitars, bass guitars and drums amongst western instruments and chung, boreendo, shehnai, danbooro, sarangi, narr, sitar, flute and dholak/tabla, along with other percussion instruments closer to home. Later on the students who show interest in the field of music production will also be provided with studio facilities to harness their skills.

== Discography ==
=== Albums ===
- Dastkari (2009)
- You (2016)
- Saanjhi (2019)

=== Music videos and singles ===
- Meena

=== Coke Studio ===
- season 4: "Mandh Waai"
- season 11: Dastaan-e-Moomal Rano
