= Akhtar Chanal Zahri =

Balochi folk singer

- Born: 1954 (age 72); Khuzdar, Balochistan, Pakistan
- Occupation: Folk singer
- Years active: 1973 – present
- Awards: Pride of Performance Award (1998)

Akhtar Chanal Zahri (born 1954) is a Baloch folk singer from Pakistan. He is famous for his singing in Coke Studio Pakistan.

== Career ==
Akhtar Chanal Zahri was born at Khuzdar, Balochistan, Pakistan in 1954. In 1964, Akhtar Chanal started taking formal singing lessons from a music Ustad. In 1973, he brought regional folk music to national attention after he was discovered by the Pakistan Broadcasting Corporation (PBC)'s Balochi radio station, and in 1974 Chanal's music became popular nationwide when his song Deer Deer was first aired live on national TV. Since then, Chanal has traveled all over the world, including the United States, the Netherlands and elsewhere in Europe for tours. He performed in a concert arranged at the Shanghai Cooperation Organisation for the political leaders meeting at the 2019 summit. Former Prime Minister of Pakistan Benazir Bhutto took him on a tour to England. When Atal Bihari Vajpayee visited Islamabad, Pakistan in 2004, he performed at an event organized for him.

Akhtar Chanal Zahri reportedly has said in an interview, "The songs I hummed as a youngster watching my sheep, are embedded in my memory. Where I come from, when a child is born, the only two things he knows how to do are sing and cry – music is part of us from the very beginning".

== Songs ==
Some of his famous songs are:

- Daanah Pah Daanah
- Da Sande Zehri
- Baloch
- Nar Bait
- Afghan Jalebi (Doumbek Version) from Phantom (2015)
- Shonk O Bijili
- Je Aoo Patari

== Filmography ==
- Mirzya (film) - a 2016 Bollywood film

== Awards and recognition ==
- Pride of Performance Award by the President of Pakistan in 1998.
