= Chardha =

Stringed instrument

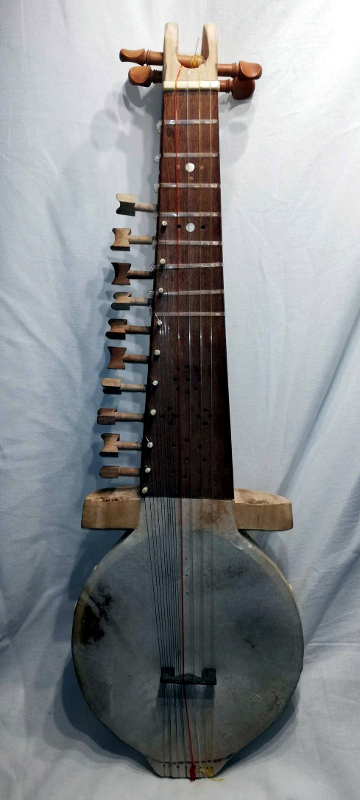
Chardha built by Nashenas Naujawân. Front view.

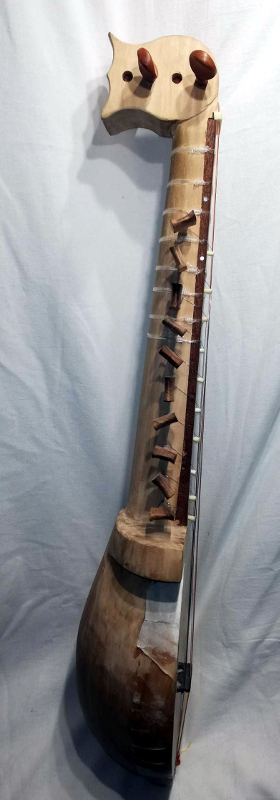
Chardha built by Nashenas Naujawân. Side view.

The Chardha (also Charda, Chardah or Hunza Rubab) is a stringed instrument from Pakistan and Afghanistan, from and mainly played in the Hunza valley and Gilgit-Baltistan province. It has 4 or 5 main playing strings made of gut or nylon, and many metal resonance strings.
