= Ishaq Samejo =

Pakistani Sindhi-language poet and literary critic (born 1975)

- اسحاق سميجو
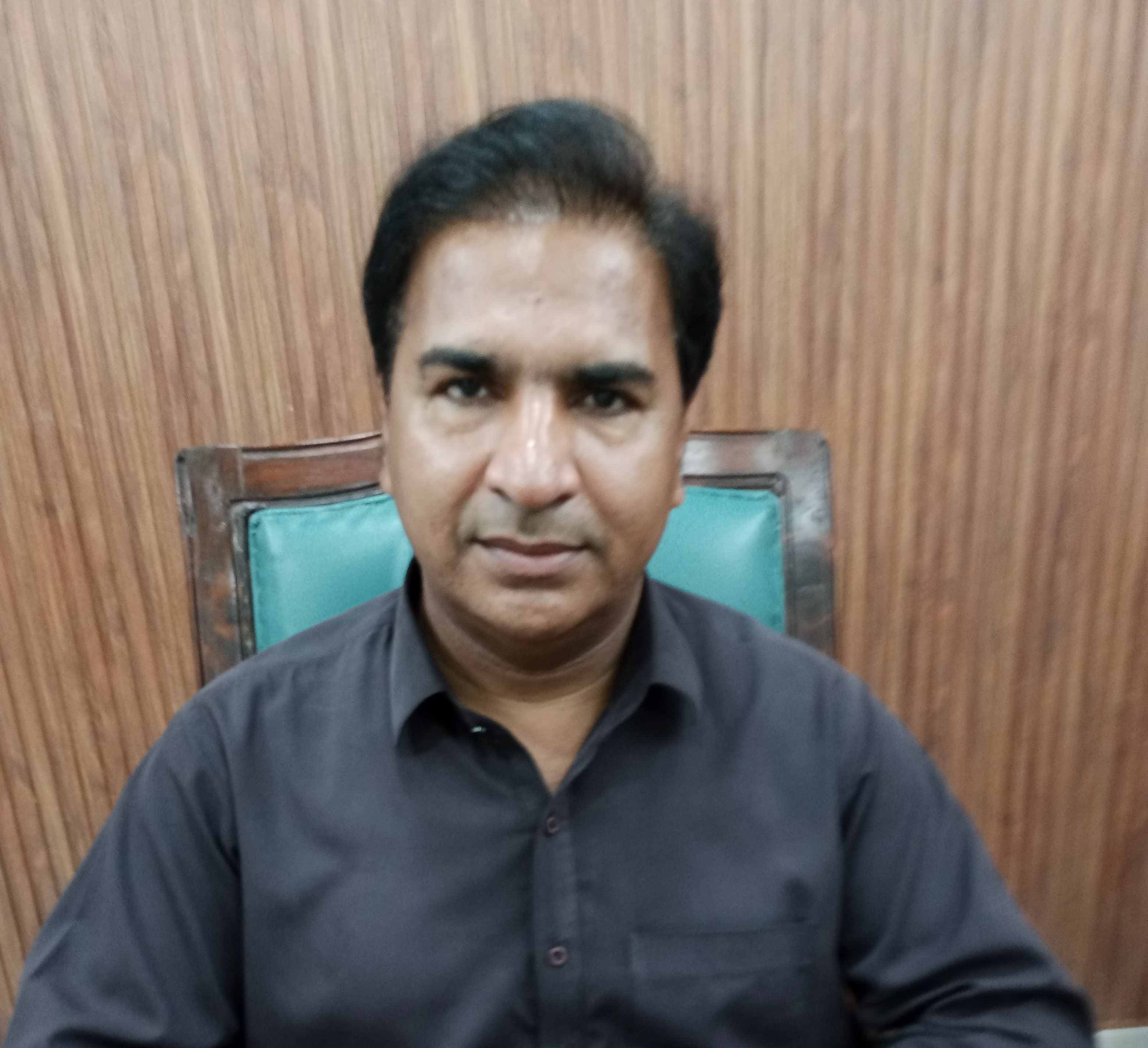
- Born: Muhammad Ishaq Samejo; 18 March 1975 (age 51); Fazalpur, Dadu District, Sindh, Pakistan
- Education: MA, PhD (Sindhi literature)
- Alma mater: University of Sindh
- Occupations: Poet; critic; academic
- Writing career
- Language: Sindhi
- Notable works: Sada Bechain Aahe; Shairi Saan Dushmani; Mor Nagar Te Meenhan
- Notable awards: Shah Abdul Latif Bhitai Award (2022)

Muhammad Ishaq Samejo (Sindhi: اسحاق سميجو; born 18 March 1975) is a Pakistani Sindhi-language poet and literary critic. He is a professor in the Department of Sindhi at the University of Sindh and has served as chairman of the Sindhi Language Authority since 2022.

== Early life and education ==
Samejo was born on 18 March 1975 in the village of Fazalpur, Dadu District, Sindh. He matriculated from Talibul Moula High School in Dadu and completed his higher secondary education at a college in Johi. He took his MA in Sindhi literature at the University of Sindh, Jamshoro, and completed a PhD at the same university in 2014.

== Career ==
Samejo began publishing poetry and criticism in 1990. He joined the Department of Sindhi at the University of Sindh as a lecturer and was later promoted to professor. He has held the Mirza Kalich Beg Chair and chaired the Department of Sindhi at the university, and has served as director of the Institute of Sindhology.

In 2022, Samejo was appointed chairman of the Sindhi Language Authority, a statutory body of the Government of Sindh. He sits on the advisory board of the Authority's research journal Sindhi Boli and has served on the Sindhi-language judging panel of the Pakistan Academy of Letters.

== Works ==
=== Poetry ===
- Sada Bechain Aahe (Hyderabad: Naon Janam, 2001)
- Dil Jo Rasto (Kandiaro: Roshni, 2003)
- Geroo Ves Ghazal (Kandiaro: Roshni, 2004)
- Gunaah Ja Geet (Kandiaro: Roshni, 2006)
- Hikrri Huie Benazir (Kandiaro: Roshni, 2008)
- Nav-a Halee Aa Geet Khani (Kandiaro: Roshni, 2009)
- Mor Nagar Te Meenhan (Sindhi: مور نگر تي مينھن, 2020)
- Biye Paasy Qabeelo Ho (2023)

=== Criticism ===
- Shairi Saan Dushmani (Hyderabad: Naon Janam, 2005)

=== Compilations ===
- Duniya Joon Lok Aakhaniyoon (Hyderabad: Zindagi, 1998)
- Tareekhi Manhoon Tareekhi Galhioon (Parts I and II) (Hyderabad: Sohni, 1998)

== Awards ==
In March 2022, the Pakistan Academy of Letters awarded Samejo the Shah Abdul Latif Bhitai Award for Sindhi poetry, part of its National Literary Awards for 2020, for his collection Mor Nagar Te Meenhan.
