= Chang (instrument) =

Musical instrument

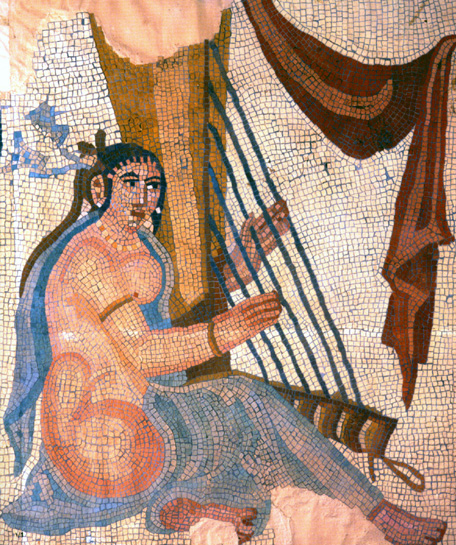
- A Sasanian era mosaic excavated at Bishapur
- Classification: string instrument
- Hornbostel–Sachs classification: 322.12 (angular harp)

Related instruments
- Çeng; Konghou; Harp; ჩანგი - Changi (Georgian instrument)

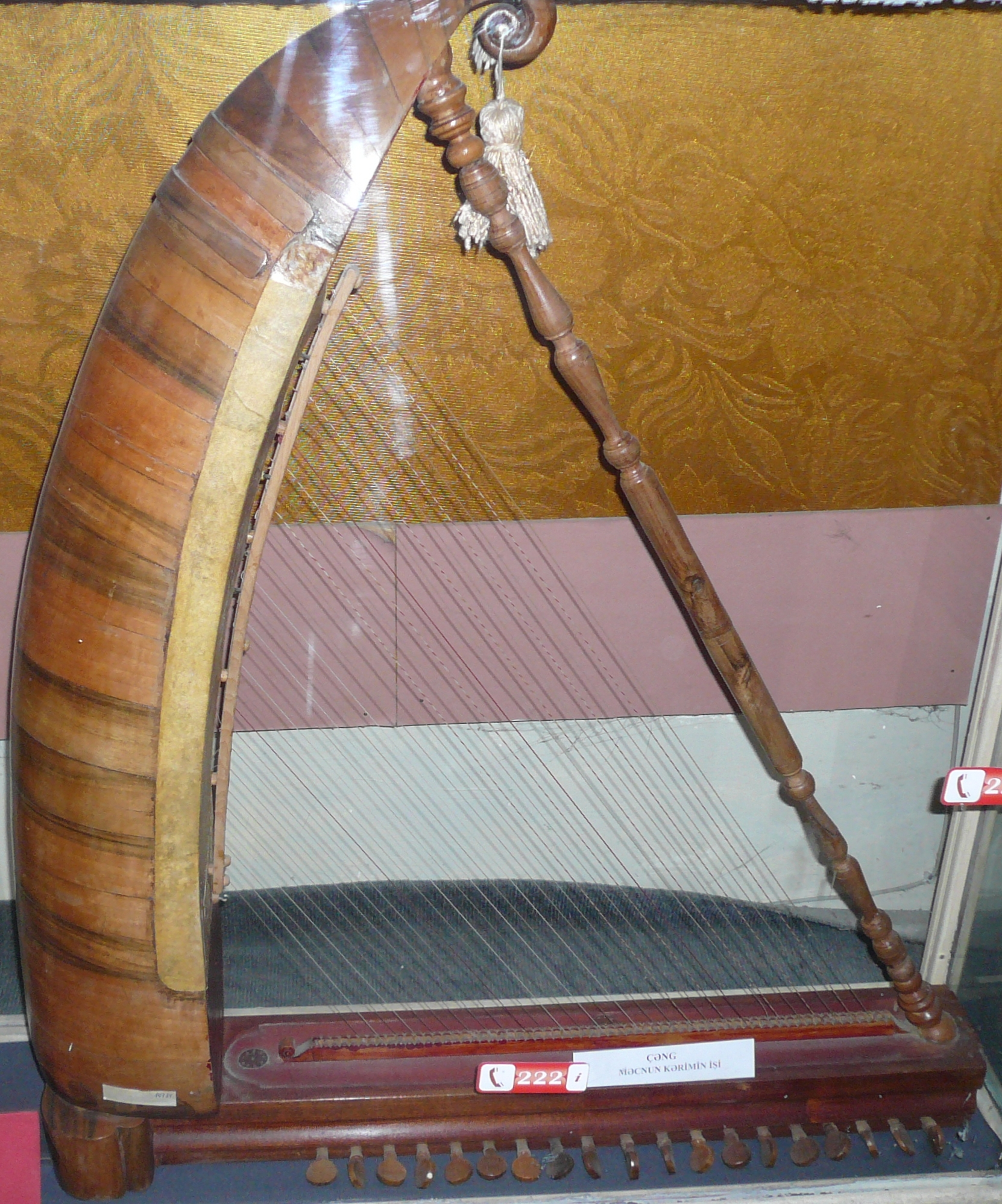
Chang. Museum of musical instruments, Baku, Azerbaijan

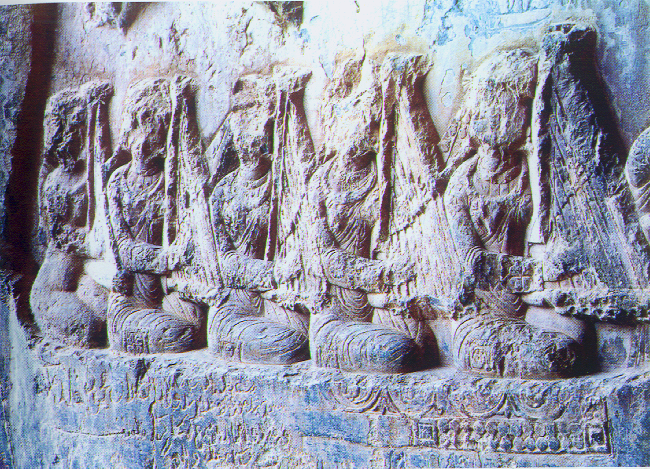
Taq-e Bostan carving. Women playing changs while the king is standing in a boat holding his bow and arrows, from 6th century Sasanian Iran.

The chang (Persian: چنگ; Persian pronunciation: [tʃæŋɡ]; Turkish: çeng; Arabic: جَنْك al-ǧank or صَنْج ṣanǧ; Georgian: ჩანგი changi) is a Persian musical instrument, a vertical angular harp. It was very popular and used widely in ancient Persia, especially during the Sasanian era where it was often played in the Sasanian royal court. It was also played until the 19th century in the Ottoman Empire but has since disappeared from Turkish folk music.

== History ==
The chang first appears in paintings and wall art in Persia in about 4000 BCE. In these paintings and mosaics, the chang went from the original arched harp to an angular harp in the early 1900s BCE, with vertical or horizontal sound boxes.

From the Hellenistic period (~300 BCE) and through beginning of Common Era (~1 CE), the chang changed shape to be less of a handheld instrument and more of a large, standing harp, and subsequently gained in popularity.

Sasanian courts were enamored with the Hellenistic chang, which increased its popularity, and by the end of the Sasanian period the chang had been redesigned to be as light as possible.

By becoming more slender, the chang lost much of its rigidity and structural soundness, but gained a portability that made it the primary harp for Islamic Iran. The chang that is used today resembles the last documented transformation.

== Structure ==
The chang is essentially an Iranian harp, but unlike an eastern harp the strings are made of sheep gut and twisted goat hair and sometimes even nylon. This characteristic stringing gives the chang a unique sound; it does not have the resonance of metal strings in other folk-harps.

In medieval Azerbaijan, the chang had 18–24 strings but this varies based on how far the chang dates back. In the design of some ancient changs, sheepskin or goatskin was used to amplify the sound making it sound closer to an eastern harp, but its unique sound is desirable and typically preserved.

The chang is played by plucking the strings with your right hand finger nails or finger picks and using your left hand to apply pressure on the strings to execute glissandos, vibratos, and other embellishments, and occasionally, plucking techniques. In modern days the chang is made out of special string or the tail of a horse.

The past body of the chang typically included goat- or sheep-skin. The skins used on the chang also give it a different sound.

== Musicians ==
The chang was predominantly played by women during ancient times. However, the chang is being revived and is now starting to make its way back into the field of contemporary Persian music. There are depictions from as far back as 4000 BCE that show the chang being played, along with other instruments, and a singer.

Since the playing style of the chang does not share any similarities with other Persian instruments, it is a difficult instrument to pick up, play, and master. As a result, the number of chang players is small.

There are a few modern players of the chang including Mrs. Parvin Ruhi and her two daughters, Zaynab Baqeri Nejad and Masome Baqeri Nejad.

Today the chang is played in small ensembles, such as religious ceremonies and parties.

== Other usages in music ==
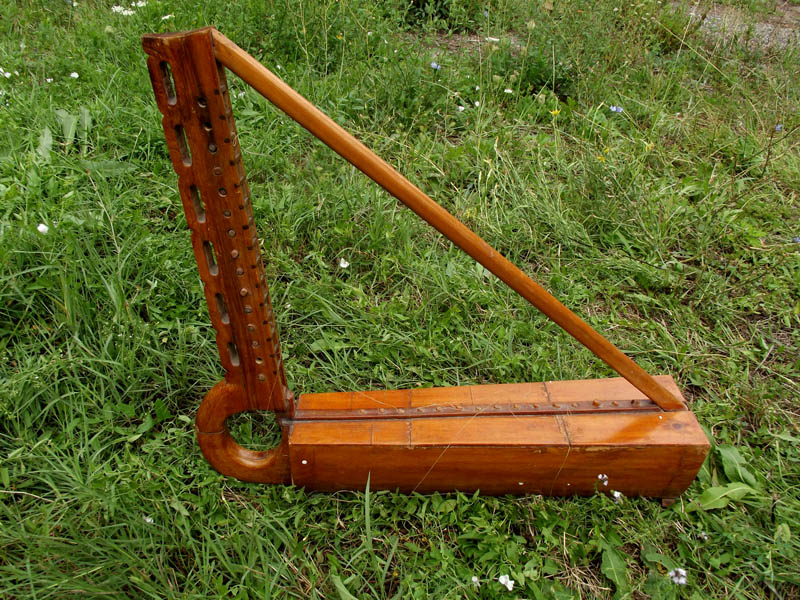
Georgian Changi, Svaneti (ჩანგი)

The chang (or Chinese chang) is also a name given to the fangxiang, a Chinese metallophone played in China since ancient times.

The Uzbek chang is a hammered dulcimer, similar to the Chinese Yangqin.

The Burmese harp, called saung (စောင်း, transliterated 'caung:' in MLCTS), is etymologically derived from the Persian word "chang," which is the Persian arched harp.

== See also ==
- Çeng
- The Turkish harpist (Manuchehri)

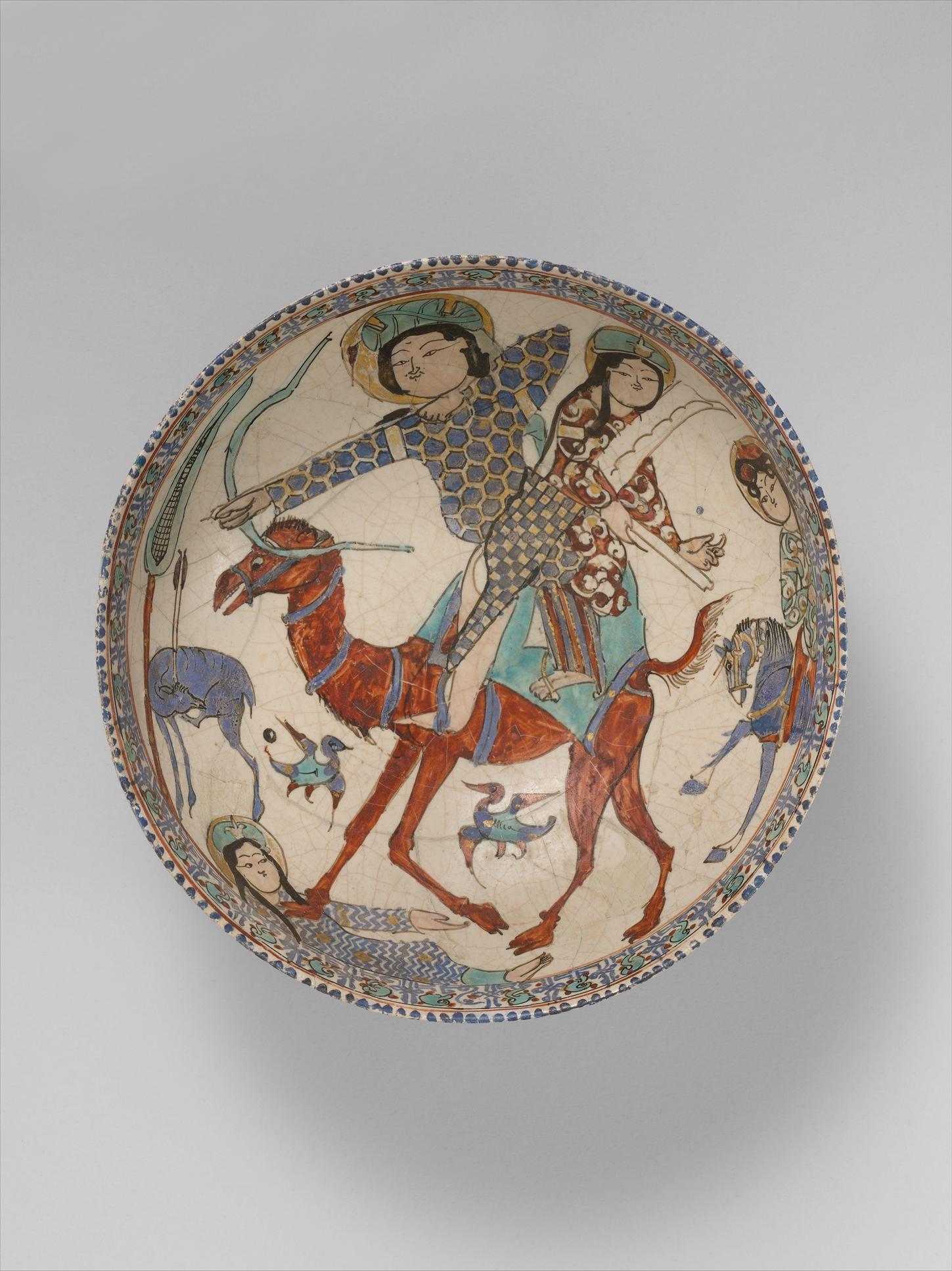
Azadeh plays the chang, riding behind Bahram Gur.
