= Samina Baig =

Pakistani high-altitude mountaineer

- Born: Samina Khayal Baig; 19 September 1990 (age 36); Shimshal, Gilgit-Baltistan, Pakistan
- Occupation: Mountaineer

Samina Khayal Baig (Urdu: ثمینہ خیال بیگ; born 19 September 1990) is a Pakistani mountaineer who climbed Mount Everest in 2013, all Seven Summits by 2014, and K2 in 2022. She is the first Pakistani woman to climb Everest, K2 and the Seven Summits. She climbed Mt. Everest at the age of 21.

Samina was the first to climb the peak Chashkin Sar (above 6,000 meters) in Pakistan in 2010, which was later renamed Samina Peak after her. She reached the summit of 'Koh-i-Brobar' ('Mount Equality') in 2011. An attempt at the seven kilometer high Spantik Peak ended in failure for Baig, due to adverse weather conditions.

Samina was able to climb K2 in July 2022 at the age of 31 years 10 months and 5 days. She is the first Pakistani woman to achieve this feat.

== Early life and career ==
Baig hails from Shimshal village in Hunza Gojal, Gilgit–Baltistan, Pakistan, and was trained in mountaineering from the age of 15 by her brother, Mirza Ali. She is a student of Arts and began climbing when she was merely four years old. Besides the Himalayas, Baig has been employed as a mountain guide and expedition leader in the Hindu Kush and the peaks of Karakoram. Baig has been a professional climber since 2009. Special Communications Organization (SCO), a telecom operator in Azad Jammu & Kashmir and Gilgit Baltistan has appointed her as its brand ambassador.

== Career ==
=== Mount Everest ===
Samina Baig became the first Pakistani woman to climb Mount Everest on 19 May 2013. She was joined by Indian twin girls Tashi and Nungshi Malik in climbing Mount Everest and they together perched national flags of India and Pakistan side-by-side atop the peak, to spread a message of Indo-Pakistani friendship and peace. In an interview with her brother before the ascent; Baig also stated that the expedition was a demonstration of gender equality. Samina's brother, Mirza Ali, approximately 248m short from the summit of Everest, let his sister go to the summit on her own without his support, to present a message of female empowerment in Pakistan.

The Express Tribune reported that Baig had not used any supplementary oxygen, although The Hindu reported that she had planned otherwise. On 1 April, Baig and company climbed the Nepalese south face of the mountain. The expedition to the summit took 48 days, the team traversed the South Col pass in eight hours, with the mountaineers reaching their goal on the sixtieth anniversary of Edmund Hillary and Sherpa Tenzing's first successful conquest of Everest. She was congratulated for the achievement by the President of Pakistan Asif Ali Zardari.

=== Seven Summits ===
Map of the Seven Summits (actually nine, depending on definition).

"Samina Baig captured all of the seven summits at only 23 years of age. We had the greatest honor to hoist our green flag on the seven summits," said Mirza Ali who accompanied Samina Baig on the seven summits adventure, updating his Facebook page.

Aconcagua (December 2013); In December 2013, they climbed Aconcagua in Argentina, the highest peak in South America. The Alpine Club of Pakistan reported that the duo arrived at the top of Aconcagua – which is 6,961 meters (or 22,838 feet) high.

Mount Vinson (January 2014); Baig and Ali successfully scaled the 4,892-meter Mount Vinson in the planet's southernmost continent around 1 am PST as part of a five-member team, the Alpine Federation said.

Mount Kilimanjaro (February 2014); Mirza Ali and Samina Baig reached the summit of Mount Kilimanjaro (5895m) in Tanzania in February 2014.

Carstensz Pyramid (March 2014); In March, Samina Baig and Mirza Ali reached the top of the 4,884 meters-high Carstensz Pyramid (Puncak Jaya), the highest peak in Indonesia.

Mount McKinley and Mount Elbrus (3–24 July 2014); The two flew out to Russia, after summiting Mount McKinley on 3 July 2014 in Alaska, where they pushed to capture the highest mountain in Europe, Mount Elbrus, which is 5,642 meters tall. At 9 am on 24 July 2014, Samina Baig stood at the top of Mt Elbrus, the highest peak in Russia, with her brother, holding the Pakistani flag high for a picture. With this summit, the 23 years old climber completed the challenge of climbing seven of the highest mountains around the world, including Mount Everest which she conquered in May, 2013.

=== Late career ===
In February 2018, Baig was named Pakistan's National Goodwill Ambassador by UNDP.

In July 2022, Samina summited K2 at the age of 31 years 10 months and 5 days. She is the first Pakistani woman to achieve this feat.

In July 2023, Baig became the second Pakistani women to climb the 8,125-metre-tall Nanga Parbat — the world’s 9th-highest peak.

== In popular culture ==
A documentary film Beyond the Heights was also made on her expedition to Mount Everest.

== Awards and honours ==
In 2014, she was awarded the President’s Award for Pride of Performance.

== See also ==
- Amir Mehdi
- Nazir Sabir
- Ashraf Aman
- Naila Kiani
- Meherban Karim
