= Mai Dhai =

Pakistani singer (born 1919)

- Born: 1943 or 1944 (age 82–83); Barmer district, Rajputana, British India
- Genres: Dhatki, Marwari and Sindhi folk music
- Years active: 1960–present

Mai Dhai (Urdu: مای دھائی) is a Pakistani classical singer hailing from Tharparkar, Sindh. She formed a folk-band called Mai Dhai Band composed of Jamal Shab, a harmonium player and dhol player, Muhammad Fakir. Mai and her band has performed in the United States at SXSW Music 2015, where her music style was met with extravagant positive response. She rose to prominence on national television after appearing as a featured artist in eight season of music series Coke Studio.

== Early life and career ==
Mai belongs to the Manganiar community. In 2013, she appeared in Lahooti Live Sessions a Live Music Sessions to promote Indigenous Music Sufi/Folk music, musicians, instruments among masses specially youth which is produced by the band The Sketches. She rose to fame after performing in Lahooti Live Sessions. In March 2015, as a part of DubMC collaboration with the US embassy in Pakistan and Foundation for Arts, Culture and Education (FACE) at SXSW Music 2015 Global program, Mai performed in New York City at Graduate Center of City University. In an interview with Broadway world, she said, "I have confidence in my voice and the culture I come from," she states. "Things around here are getting stricter, especially when it comes to a woman singing on stage. I am the only women from the Manganiyar Tribe who has performed on a big stage But I am hopeful that things will get better, maybe for the next generation. And as long as my voice is with me I will keep singing."

The Sketches & Lahooti Live Sessions helped Mai Dhai to appear in Coke Studio Pakistan. In 2015, she debuted in the eight season of Pakistani music reality television series Coke Studio, where she sang two songs including "Aankhaṛli Phaṛookai" and "Kadi Ao Ni with artists Karam Abbas Khan & Atif Aslam respectively. Mai's appearance with Atif on Coke studio was received well by critics and viewers.

Before appearing in Coke Studio, Saif Samejo of The Sketches collaborated with Mai, in an interview with Express Tribune he said, "The style in which Mai Dhai is performing on Coke Studio is her natural style, whereas we have tried to incorporate our style of music into hers, so that it retains its original Rajasthani flavour while also sounding like a dialogue between us." She sang two songs with the band.

In 2024, she was honored by the Government of Pakistan with Pride of Performance for her contributions to the Music Industry.

== Discography ==
- "Doro" (with Saif Samejo) The Sketches (Lahooti Live Sessions) (2013)
- "Moriya (with Saif Samejo) The Sketches (Lahooti Live Sessions) (2015)
- "Sarak Sarak" – Mai Dhai Band
- "La Gorey" – Mai Dhai Band
- "Aankhaṛli Phaṛookai" (with Karam Abbas Khan) – Coke Studio Pakistan (season 8)
- "Kadi Ao Ni" (with Atif Aslam) – Coke Studio Pakistan (season 8)

== Filmography ==
- Ho Mann Jahaan – "Sarak Sarak"

== Awards and recognition ==
Year	Award	Category	Result	Title	Ref.
2016	Latif Awards	Best Singer	Won	Music	
2017	Nigar Awards	Best Playback Singer	Won	Ho Mann Jahaan	
2024	Pride of Performance	Award by the President of Pakistan	Won	Radio & Music	
